

35001–35100 

|-bgcolor=#fefefe
| 35001 ||  || — || November 7, 1978 || Palomar || E. F. Helin, S. J. Bus || MAS || align=right | 1.9 km || 
|-id=002 bgcolor=#d6d6d6
| 35002 ||  || — || November 7, 1978 || Palomar || E. F. Helin, S. J. Bus || — || align=right | 14 km || 
|-id=003 bgcolor=#fefefe
| 35003 ||  || — || June 25, 1979 || Siding Spring || E. F. Helin, S. J. Bus || FLO || align=right | 1.7 km || 
|-id=004 bgcolor=#E9E9E9
| 35004 ||  || — || June 25, 1979 || Siding Spring || E. F. Helin, S. J. Bus || — || align=right | 2.1 km || 
|-id=005 bgcolor=#E9E9E9
| 35005 ||  || — || June 25, 1979 || Siding Spring || E. F. Helin, S. J. Bus || — || align=right | 2.8 km || 
|-id=006 bgcolor=#E9E9E9
| 35006 ||  || — || July 24, 1979 || Siding Spring || S. J. Bus || — || align=right | 4.9 km || 
|-id=007 bgcolor=#E9E9E9
| 35007 ||  || — || July 24, 1979 || Siding Spring || S. J. Bus || MAR || align=right | 2.8 km || 
|-id=008 bgcolor=#d6d6d6
| 35008 ||  || — || March 16, 1980 || La Silla || C.-I. Lagerkvist || — || align=right | 4.6 km || 
|-id=009 bgcolor=#fefefe
| 35009 ||  || — || October 31, 1980 || Palomar || S. J. Bus || — || align=right | 2.2 km || 
|-id=010 bgcolor=#d6d6d6
| 35010 ||  || — || February 28, 1981 || Siding Spring || S. J. Bus || — || align=right | 3.6 km || 
|-id=011 bgcolor=#E9E9E9
| 35011 ||  || — || February 28, 1981 || Siding Spring || S. J. Bus || — || align=right | 5.0 km || 
|-id=012 bgcolor=#d6d6d6
| 35012 ||  || — || March 2, 1981 || Siding Spring || S. J. Bus || — || align=right | 4.4 km || 
|-id=013 bgcolor=#E9E9E9
| 35013 ||  || — || March 2, 1981 || Siding Spring || S. J. Bus || GEF || align=right | 2.4 km || 
|-id=014 bgcolor=#d6d6d6
| 35014 ||  || — || March 7, 1981 || Siding Spring || S. J. Bus || EOS || align=right | 4.2 km || 
|-id=015 bgcolor=#E9E9E9
| 35015 ||  || — || March 6, 1981 || Siding Spring || S. J. Bus || — || align=right | 2.4 km || 
|-id=016 bgcolor=#d6d6d6
| 35016 ||  || — || March 6, 1981 || Siding Spring || S. J. Bus || HIL3:2 || align=right | 12 km || 
|-id=017 bgcolor=#fefefe
| 35017 ||  || — || March 6, 1981 || Siding Spring || S. J. Bus || V || align=right | 1.5 km || 
|-id=018 bgcolor=#d6d6d6
| 35018 ||  || — || March 1, 1981 || Siding Spring || S. J. Bus || — || align=right | 4.6 km || 
|-id=019 bgcolor=#fefefe
| 35019 ||  || — || March 1, 1981 || Siding Spring || S. J. Bus || V || align=right | 2.0 km || 
|-id=020 bgcolor=#d6d6d6
| 35020 ||  || — || March 1, 1981 || Siding Spring || S. J. Bus || — || align=right | 5.7 km || 
|-id=021 bgcolor=#d6d6d6
| 35021 ||  || — || March 1, 1981 || Siding Spring || S. J. Bus || — || align=right | 4.1 km || 
|-id=022 bgcolor=#fefefe
| 35022 ||  || — || March 1, 1981 || Siding Spring || S. J. Bus || V || align=right | 1.8 km || 
|-id=023 bgcolor=#E9E9E9
| 35023 ||  || — || March 1, 1981 || Siding Spring || S. J. Bus || — || align=right | 6.6 km || 
|-id=024 bgcolor=#d6d6d6
| 35024 ||  || — || March 1, 1981 || Siding Spring || S. J. Bus || — || align=right | 6.3 km || 
|-id=025 bgcolor=#d6d6d6
| 35025 ||  || — || March 1, 1981 || Siding Spring || S. J. Bus || EOS || align=right | 4.5 km || 
|-id=026 bgcolor=#d6d6d6
| 35026 ||  || — || March 6, 1981 || Siding Spring || S. J. Bus || — || align=right | 4.4 km || 
|-id=027 bgcolor=#E9E9E9
| 35027 ||  || — || March 2, 1981 || Siding Spring || S. J. Bus || — || align=right | 2.0 km || 
|-id=028 bgcolor=#E9E9E9
| 35028 ||  || — || March 2, 1981 || Siding Spring || S. J. Bus || — || align=right | 2.0 km || 
|-id=029 bgcolor=#fefefe
| 35029 ||  || — || March 2, 1981 || Siding Spring || S. J. Bus || NYS || align=right | 1.1 km || 
|-id=030 bgcolor=#d6d6d6
| 35030 ||  || — || March 2, 1981 || Siding Spring || S. J. Bus || — || align=right | 4.5 km || 
|-id=031 bgcolor=#E9E9E9
| 35031 ||  || — || March 3, 1981 || Siding Spring || S. J. Bus || — || align=right | 4.6 km || 
|-id=032 bgcolor=#fefefe
| 35032 ||  || — || March 2, 1981 || Siding Spring || S. J. Bus || KLI || align=right | 5.1 km || 
|-id=033 bgcolor=#d6d6d6
| 35033 ||  || — || March 2, 1981 || Siding Spring || S. J. Bus || — || align=right | 6.7 km || 
|-id=034 bgcolor=#E9E9E9
| 35034 ||  || — || March 2, 1981 || Siding Spring || S. J. Bus || — || align=right | 3.4 km || 
|-id=035 bgcolor=#E9E9E9
| 35035 ||  || — || March 1, 1981 || Siding Spring || S. J. Bus || — || align=right | 4.3 km || 
|-id=036 bgcolor=#d6d6d6
| 35036 ||  || — || March 2, 1981 || Siding Spring || S. J. Bus || — || align=right | 7.7 km || 
|-id=037 bgcolor=#d6d6d6
| 35037 ||  || — || March 6, 1981 || Siding Spring || S. J. Bus || — || align=right | 4.5 km || 
|-id=038 bgcolor=#E9E9E9
| 35038 ||  || — || March 7, 1981 || Siding Spring || S. J. Bus || — || align=right | 4.4 km || 
|-id=039 bgcolor=#E9E9E9
| 35039 ||  || — || March 1, 1981 || Siding Spring || S. J. Bus || EUN || align=right | 2.0 km || 
|-id=040 bgcolor=#E9E9E9
| 35040 ||  || — || March 1, 1981 || Siding Spring || S. J. Bus || HNS || align=right | 3.1 km || 
|-id=041 bgcolor=#d6d6d6
| 35041 ||  || — || March 2, 1981 || Siding Spring || S. J. Bus || VER || align=right | 5.1 km || 
|-id=042 bgcolor=#fefefe
| 35042 ||  || — || March 7, 1981 || Siding Spring || S. J. Bus || — || align=right | 3.7 km || 
|-id=043 bgcolor=#fefefe
| 35043 ||  || — || March 1, 1981 || Siding Spring || S. J. Bus || — || align=right | 2.1 km || 
|-id=044 bgcolor=#E9E9E9
| 35044 ||  || — || March 2, 1981 || Siding Spring || S. J. Bus || — || align=right | 3.7 km || 
|-id=045 bgcolor=#d6d6d6
| 35045 ||  || — || March 2, 1981 || Siding Spring || S. J. Bus || HYG || align=right | 5.2 km || 
|-id=046 bgcolor=#E9E9E9
| 35046 ||  || — || March 3, 1981 || Siding Spring || S. J. Bus || HEN || align=right | 2.3 km || 
|-id=047 bgcolor=#d6d6d6
| 35047 ||  || — || March 6, 1981 || Siding Spring || S. J. Bus || HYG || align=right | 6.6 km || 
|-id=048 bgcolor=#d6d6d6
| 35048 ||  || — || March 15, 1981 || Siding Spring || S. J. Bus || — || align=right | 6.2 km || 
|-id=049 bgcolor=#d6d6d6
| 35049 ||  || — || March 2, 1981 || Siding Spring || S. J. Bus || HYG || align=right | 6.3 km || 
|-id=050 bgcolor=#fefefe
| 35050 ||  || — || March 2, 1981 || Siding Spring || S. J. Bus || — || align=right | 2.8 km || 
|-id=051 bgcolor=#fefefe
| 35051 ||  || — || March 2, 1981 || Siding Spring || S. J. Bus || NYS || align=right | 1.2 km || 
|-id=052 bgcolor=#d6d6d6
| 35052 ||  || — || May 15, 1982 || Palomar || Palomar Obs. || — || align=right | 7.2 km || 
|-id=053 bgcolor=#fefefe
| 35053 Rojyurij ||  ||  || October 25, 1982 || Nauchnij || L. V. Zhuravleva || NYS || align=right | 2.4 km || 
|-id=054 bgcolor=#E9E9E9
| 35054 || 1983 WK || — || November 28, 1983 || Anderson Mesa || E. Bowell || — || align=right | 6.0 km || 
|-id=055 bgcolor=#fefefe
| 35055 || 1984 RB || — || September 2, 1984 || Palomar || E. F. Helin || H || align=right | 1.5 km || 
|-id=056 bgcolor=#FA8072
| 35056 Cullers || 1984 ST ||  || September 28, 1984 || Palomar || C. S. Shoemaker, E. M. Shoemaker || — || align=right | 4.6 km || 
|-id=057 bgcolor=#E9E9E9
| 35057 ||  || — || September 23, 1984 || La Silla || H. Debehogne || — || align=right | 3.2 km || 
|-id=058 bgcolor=#fefefe
| 35058 ||  || — || September 12, 1985 || La Silla || H. Debehogne || — || align=right | 2.6 km || 
|-id=059 bgcolor=#fefefe
| 35059 ||  || — || August 27, 1986 || La Silla || H. Debehogne || EUT || align=right | 1.8 km || 
|-id=060 bgcolor=#E9E9E9
| 35060 ||  || — || August 29, 1986 || La Silla || H. Debehogne || — || align=right | 4.4 km || 
|-id=061 bgcolor=#E9E9E9
| 35061 ||  || — || August 29, 1986 || La Silla || H. Debehogne || — || align=right | 4.7 km || 
|-id=062 bgcolor=#fefefe
| 35062 Sakuranosyou || 1988 EP ||  || March 12, 1988 || Kobuchizawa || M. Inoue, O. Muramatsu || — || align=right | 3.2 km || 
|-id=063 bgcolor=#fefefe
| 35063 || 1988 FD || — || March 16, 1988 || Kushiro || S. Ueda, H. Kaneda || PHO || align=right | 6.0 km || 
|-id=064 bgcolor=#E9E9E9
| 35064 ||  || — || September 14, 1988 || Cerro Tololo || S. J. Bus || — || align=right | 2.7 km || 
|-id=065 bgcolor=#d6d6d6
| 35065 ||  || — || September 16, 1988 || Cerro Tololo || S. J. Bus || EOS || align=right | 8.3 km || 
|-id=066 bgcolor=#E9E9E9
| 35066 ||  || — || September 16, 1988 || Cerro Tololo || S. J. Bus || — || align=right | 5.4 km || 
|-id=067 bgcolor=#fefefe
| 35067 || 1989 LL || — || June 4, 1989 || Palomar || E. F. Helin || FLO || align=right | 2.9 km || 
|-id=068 bgcolor=#d6d6d6
| 35068 ||  || — || September 26, 1989 || La Silla || E. W. Elst || — || align=right | 8.5 km || 
|-id=069 bgcolor=#fefefe
| 35069 ||  || — || September 26, 1989 || La Silla || E. W. Elst || — || align=right | 2.7 km || 
|-id=070 bgcolor=#d6d6d6
| 35070 ||  || — || October 7, 1989 || La Silla || E. W. Elst || — || align=right | 6.2 km || 
|-id=071 bgcolor=#fefefe
| 35071 ||  || — || October 7, 1989 || La Silla || E. W. Elst || — || align=right | 2.9 km || 
|-id=072 bgcolor=#fefefe
| 35072 ||  || — || October 7, 1989 || La Silla || E. W. Elst || NYS || align=right | 1.6 km || 
|-id=073 bgcolor=#fefefe
| 35073 ||  || — || October 4, 1989 || La Silla || H. Debehogne || MAS || align=right | 1.9 km || 
|-id=074 bgcolor=#fefefe
| 35074 ||  || — || October 25, 1989 || Gekko || Y. Oshima || NYS || align=right | 2.5 km || 
|-id=075 bgcolor=#d6d6d6
| 35075 ||  || — || December 2, 1989 || La Silla || E. W. Elst || EOS || align=right | 7.0 km || 
|-id=076 bgcolor=#E9E9E9
| 35076 Yataro ||  ||  || January 21, 1990 || Geisei || T. Seki || — || align=right | 11 km || 
|-id=077 bgcolor=#fefefe
| 35077 ||  || — || July 30, 1990 || Palomar || H. E. Holt || FLO || align=right | 2.3 km || 
|-id=078 bgcolor=#fefefe
| 35078 ||  || — || August 20, 1990 || La Silla || E. W. Elst || — || align=right | 3.7 km || 
|-id=079 bgcolor=#fefefe
| 35079 ||  || — || August 16, 1990 || La Silla || E. W. Elst || — || align=right | 1.9 km || 
|-id=080 bgcolor=#fefefe
| 35080 ||  || — || August 16, 1990 || La Silla || E. W. Elst || — || align=right | 4.4 km || 
|-id=081 bgcolor=#fefefe
| 35081 ||  || — || August 16, 1990 || La Silla || E. W. Elst || — || align=right | 2.2 km || 
|-id=082 bgcolor=#fefefe
| 35082 ||  || — || September 14, 1990 || Palomar || H. E. Holt || — || align=right | 2.1 km || 
|-id=083 bgcolor=#fefefe
| 35083 ||  || — || September 22, 1990 || La Silla || E. W. Elst || FLO || align=right | 2.0 km || 
|-id=084 bgcolor=#fefefe
| 35084 ||  || — || September 22, 1990 || La Silla || E. W. Elst || FLO || align=right | 1.9 km || 
|-id=085 bgcolor=#fefefe
| 35085 ||  || — || September 16, 1990 || Palomar || H. E. Holt || FLO || align=right | 3.1 km || 
|-id=086 bgcolor=#fefefe
| 35086 ||  || — || October 14, 1990 || Kleť || A. Mrkos || FLO || align=right | 3.6 km || 
|-id=087 bgcolor=#fefefe
| 35087 von Sydow ||  ||  || October 16, 1990 || La Silla || E. W. Elst || H || align=right | 1.8 km || 
|-id=088 bgcolor=#fefefe
| 35088 ||  || — || November 15, 1990 || La Silla || E. W. Elst || — || align=right | 2.0 km || 
|-id=089 bgcolor=#fefefe
| 35089 ||  || — || November 18, 1990 || La Silla || E. W. Elst || — || align=right | 3.0 km || 
|-id=090 bgcolor=#fefefe
| 35090 ||  || — || November 18, 1990 || La Silla || E. W. Elst || — || align=right | 2.8 km || 
|-id=091 bgcolor=#d6d6d6
| 35091 ||  || — || November 18, 1990 || La Silla || E. W. Elst || EOS || align=right | 5.3 km || 
|-id=092 bgcolor=#fefefe
| 35092 ||  || — || November 21, 1990 || La Silla || E. W. Elst || — || align=right | 3.0 km || 
|-id=093 bgcolor=#d6d6d6
| 35093 Akicity ||  ||  || March 14, 1991 || Geisei || T. Seki || HYG || align=right | 9.2 km || 
|-id=094 bgcolor=#d6d6d6
| 35094 ||  || — || April 8, 1991 || La Silla || E. W. Elst || THM || align=right | 8.2 km || 
|-id=095 bgcolor=#fefefe
| 35095 ||  || — || April 8, 1991 || La Silla || E. W. Elst || NYS || align=right | 2.0 km || 
|-id=096 bgcolor=#fefefe
| 35096 ||  || — || April 8, 1991 || La Silla || E. W. Elst || NYS || align=right | 2.4 km || 
|-id=097 bgcolor=#E9E9E9
| 35097 ||  || — || April 8, 1991 || La Silla || E. W. Elst || — || align=right | 2.8 km || 
|-id=098 bgcolor=#d6d6d6
| 35098 ||  || — || April 8, 1991 || La Silla || E. W. Elst || — || align=right | 11 km || 
|-id=099 bgcolor=#fefefe
| 35099 ||  || — || April 8, 1991 || La Silla || E. W. Elst || NYS || align=right | 4.6 km || 
|-id=100 bgcolor=#E9E9E9
| 35100 || 1991 NK || — || July 8, 1991 || Palomar || E. F. Helin || JUN || align=right | 3.2 km || 
|}

35101–35200 

|-bgcolor=#E9E9E9
| 35101 ||  || — || August 7, 1991 || Palomar || H. E. Holt || — || align=right | 3.9 km || 
|-id=102 bgcolor=#E9E9E9
| 35102 || 1991 RT || — || September 4, 1991 || Palomar || E. F. Helin || — || align=right | 3.5 km || 
|-id=103 bgcolor=#d6d6d6
| 35103 ||  || — || September 15, 1991 || Palomar || H. E. Holt || KOR || align=right | 7.2 km || 
|-id=104 bgcolor=#E9E9E9
| 35104 ||  || — || September 11, 1991 || Palomar || H. E. Holt || MIT || align=right | 6.5 km || 
|-id=105 bgcolor=#E9E9E9
| 35105 ||  || — || September 15, 1991 || Palomar || H. E. Holt || MAR || align=right | 5.5 km || 
|-id=106 bgcolor=#E9E9E9
| 35106 ||  || — || October 11, 1991 || Kitt Peak || Spacewatch || — || align=right | 3.8 km || 
|-id=107 bgcolor=#FFC2E0
| 35107 || 1991 VH || — || November 9, 1991 || Siding Spring || R. H. McNaught || APO +1kmPHAmoon || align=right data-sort-value="0.93" | 930 m || 
|-id=108 bgcolor=#E9E9E9
| 35108 ||  || — || November 3, 1991 || Kitt Peak || Spacewatch || DOR || align=right | 5.1 km || 
|-id=109 bgcolor=#E9E9E9
| 35109 || 1991 XM || — || December 4, 1991 || Kushiro || S. Ueda, H. Kaneda || — || align=right | 7.2 km || 
|-id=110 bgcolor=#fefefe
| 35110 ||  || — || January 30, 1992 || La Silla || E. W. Elst || FLO || align=right | 2.4 km || 
|-id=111 bgcolor=#fefefe
| 35111 ||  || — || January 29, 1992 || Kitt Peak || Spacewatch || — || align=right | 1.4 km || 
|-id=112 bgcolor=#fefefe
| 35112 ||  || — || January 30, 1992 || La Silla || E. W. Elst || FLO || align=right | 1.6 km || 
|-id=113 bgcolor=#fefefe
| 35113 ||  || — || February 2, 1992 || La Silla || E. W. Elst || — || align=right | 3.1 km || 
|-id=114 bgcolor=#d6d6d6
| 35114 ||  || — || February 29, 1992 || La Silla || UESAC || KOR || align=right | 5.0 km || 
|-id=115 bgcolor=#d6d6d6
| 35115 ||  || — || February 29, 1992 || La Silla || UESAC || — || align=right | 6.1 km || 
|-id=116 bgcolor=#fefefe
| 35116 ||  || — || February 29, 1992 || La Silla || UESAC || — || align=right | 3.9 km || 
|-id=117 bgcolor=#fefefe
| 35117 ||  || — || February 29, 1992 || La Silla || UESAC || — || align=right | 1.6 km || 
|-id=118 bgcolor=#fefefe
| 35118 ||  || — || March 2, 1992 || La Silla || UESAC || V || align=right | 2.8 km || 
|-id=119 bgcolor=#d6d6d6
| 35119 ||  || — || March 1, 1992 || La Silla || UESAC || — || align=right | 9.7 km || 
|-id=120 bgcolor=#fefefe
| 35120 ||  || — || March 1, 1992 || La Silla || UESAC || FLO || align=right | 2.7 km || 
|-id=121 bgcolor=#fefefe
| 35121 ||  || — || March 2, 1992 || La Silla || UESAC || — || align=right | 2.4 km || 
|-id=122 bgcolor=#fefefe
| 35122 ||  || — || March 1, 1992 || La Silla || UESAC || — || align=right | 2.2 km || 
|-id=123 bgcolor=#fefefe
| 35123 ||  || — || March 1, 1992 || La Silla || UESAC || FLO || align=right | 1.9 km || 
|-id=124 bgcolor=#d6d6d6
| 35124 ||  || — || March 1, 1992 || La Silla || UESAC || — || align=right | 8.6 km || 
|-id=125 bgcolor=#fefefe
| 35125 ||  || — || March 1, 1992 || La Silla || UESAC || FLO || align=right | 1.8 km || 
|-id=126 bgcolor=#E9E9E9
| 35126 ||  || — || March 6, 1992 || La Silla || UESAC || — || align=right | 2.6 km || 
|-id=127 bgcolor=#fefefe
| 35127 ||  || — || March 2, 1992 || La Silla || UESAC || — || align=right | 2.3 km || 
|-id=128 bgcolor=#fefefe
| 35128 ||  || — || March 2, 1992 || La Silla || UESAC || FLO || align=right | 1.6 km || 
|-id=129 bgcolor=#fefefe
| 35129 ||  || — || March 3, 1992 || La Silla || UESAC || — || align=right | 2.2 km || 
|-id=130 bgcolor=#d6d6d6
| 35130 || 1992 LQ || — || June 3, 1992 || Palomar || G. J. Leonard || EOS || align=right | 9.7 km || 
|-id=131 bgcolor=#E9E9E9
| 35131 ||  || — || August 2, 1992 || Palomar || H. E. Holt || — || align=right | 3.3 km || 
|-id=132 bgcolor=#E9E9E9
| 35132 ||  || — || August 2, 1992 || Palomar || H. E. Holt || — || align=right | 2.8 km || 
|-id=133 bgcolor=#E9E9E9
| 35133 || 1992 QX || — || August 29, 1992 || Palomar || E. F. Helin || — || align=right | 3.0 km || 
|-id=134 bgcolor=#fefefe
| 35134 || 1992 RE || — || September 4, 1992 || Siding Spring || R. H. McNaught || H || align=right | 1.6 km || 
|-id=135 bgcolor=#fefefe
| 35135 ||  || — || September 1, 1992 || Palomar || E. F. Helin || CHL || align=right | 6.2 km || 
|-id=136 bgcolor=#fefefe
| 35136 ||  || — || September 2, 1992 || La Silla || E. W. Elst || — || align=right | 2.8 km || 
|-id=137 bgcolor=#fefefe
| 35137 Meudon ||  ||  || September 2, 1992 || La Silla || E. W. Elst || NYS || align=right | 3.0 km || 
|-id=138 bgcolor=#fefefe
| 35138 ||  || — || September 2, 1992 || La Silla || E. W. Elst || NYS || align=right | 2.4 km || 
|-id=139 bgcolor=#E9E9E9
| 35139 ||  || — || September 2, 1992 || La Silla || E. W. Elst || — || align=right | 4.8 km || 
|-id=140 bgcolor=#E9E9E9
| 35140 ||  || — || September 2, 1992 || La Silla || E. W. Elst || — || align=right | 2.6 km || 
|-id=141 bgcolor=#E9E9E9
| 35141 ||  || — || September 23, 1992 || Kitami || K. Endate, K. Watanabe || — || align=right | 3.4 km || 
|-id=142 bgcolor=#fefefe
| 35142 ||  || — || September 26, 1992 || Kitt Peak || Spacewatch || MAS || align=right | 1.7 km || 
|-id=143 bgcolor=#fefefe
| 35143 ||  || — || October 19, 1992 || Kitami || M. Yanai, K. Watanabe || — || align=right | 4.1 km || 
|-id=144 bgcolor=#E9E9E9
| 35144 ||  || — || December 18, 1992 || Caussols || E. W. Elst || — || align=right | 3.9 km || 
|-id=145 bgcolor=#E9E9E9
| 35145 || 1993 AM || — || January 13, 1993 || Kushiro || S. Ueda, H. Kaneda || ADE || align=right | 6.9 km || 
|-id=146 bgcolor=#d6d6d6
| 35146 ||  || — || March 17, 1993 || La Silla || UESAC || KOR || align=right | 3.9 km || 
|-id=147 bgcolor=#E9E9E9
| 35147 ||  || — || March 17, 1993 || La Silla || UESAC || — || align=right | 2.8 km || 
|-id=148 bgcolor=#d6d6d6
| 35148 ||  || — || March 17, 1993 || La Silla || UESAC || HYG || align=right | 9.3 km || 
|-id=149 bgcolor=#d6d6d6
| 35149 ||  || — || March 19, 1993 || La Silla || UESAC || — || align=right | 6.2 km || 
|-id=150 bgcolor=#d6d6d6
| 35150 ||  || — || March 19, 1993 || La Silla || UESAC || — || align=right | 7.1 km || 
|-id=151 bgcolor=#fefefe
| 35151 ||  || — || March 19, 1993 || La Silla || UESAC || — || align=right | 2.1 km || 
|-id=152 bgcolor=#d6d6d6
| 35152 ||  || — || March 19, 1993 || La Silla || UESAC || — || align=right | 7.4 km || 
|-id=153 bgcolor=#E9E9E9
| 35153 ||  || — || March 17, 1993 || La Silla || UESAC || — || align=right | 4.4 km || 
|-id=154 bgcolor=#d6d6d6
| 35154 ||  || — || March 17, 1993 || La Silla || UESAC || — || align=right | 5.7 km || 
|-id=155 bgcolor=#d6d6d6
| 35155 ||  || — || March 19, 1993 || La Silla || UESAC || — || align=right | 7.4 km || 
|-id=156 bgcolor=#d6d6d6
| 35156 ||  || — || March 19, 1993 || La Silla || UESAC || THM || align=right | 4.7 km || 
|-id=157 bgcolor=#d6d6d6
| 35157 ||  || — || March 21, 1993 || La Silla || UESAC || KOR || align=right | 2.9 km || 
|-id=158 bgcolor=#d6d6d6
| 35158 ||  || — || March 19, 1993 || La Silla || UESAC || — || align=right | 5.6 km || 
|-id=159 bgcolor=#E9E9E9
| 35159 ||  || — || June 13, 1993 || Siding Spring || R. H. McNaught || MAR || align=right | 4.3 km || 
|-id=160 bgcolor=#fefefe
| 35160 || 1993 NY || — || July 12, 1993 || La Silla || E. W. Elst || — || align=right | 3.4 km || 
|-id=161 bgcolor=#fefefe
| 35161 || 1993 OW || — || July 16, 1993 || Palomar || E. F. Helin || PHO || align=right | 3.4 km || 
|-id=162 bgcolor=#fefefe
| 35162 ||  || — || July 20, 1993 || Caussols || E. W. Elst || — || align=right | 1.8 km || 
|-id=163 bgcolor=#fefefe
| 35163 ||  || — || July 20, 1993 || La Silla || E. W. Elst || — || align=right | 1.4 km || 
|-id=164 bgcolor=#fefefe
| 35164 ||  || — || August 14, 1993 || Caussols || E. W. Elst || FLO || align=right | 3.4 km || 
|-id=165 bgcolor=#d6d6d6
| 35165 Québec ||  ||  || August 16, 1993 || Caussols || E. W. Elst || ALA || align=right | 11 km || 
|-id=166 bgcolor=#fefefe
| 35166 ||  || — || August 20, 1993 || La Silla || E. W. Elst || FLO || align=right | 2.4 km || 
|-id=167 bgcolor=#d6d6d6
| 35167 ||  || — || September 14, 1993 || La Silla || H. Debehogne, E. W. Elst || — || align=right | 9.6 km || 
|-id=168 bgcolor=#fefefe
| 35168 ||  || — || September 15, 1993 || La Silla || E. W. Elst || NYS || align=right | 2.1 km || 
|-id=169 bgcolor=#fefefe
| 35169 ||  || — || September 19, 1993 || Kitami || K. Endate, K. Watanabe || NYS || align=right | 2.2 km || 
|-id=170 bgcolor=#fefefe
| 35170 || 1993 TM || — || October 8, 1993 || Kitami || K. Endate, K. Watanabe || V || align=right | 2.6 km || 
|-id=171 bgcolor=#fefefe
| 35171 ||  || — || October 15, 1993 || Kitami || K. Endate, K. Watanabe || V || align=right | 2.8 km || 
|-id=172 bgcolor=#fefefe
| 35172 ||  || — || October 11, 1993 || Kitami || K. Endate, K. Watanabe || FLO || align=right | 2.8 km || 
|-id=173 bgcolor=#fefefe
| 35173 ||  || — || October 12, 1993 || Kitt Peak || Spacewatch || FLO || align=right | 2.8 km || 
|-id=174 bgcolor=#fefefe
| 35174 ||  || — || October 9, 1993 || La Silla || E. W. Elst || NYS || align=right | 2.1 km || 
|-id=175 bgcolor=#d6d6d6
| 35175 ||  || — || October 10, 1993 || Palomar || H. E. Holt || — || align=right | 14 km || 
|-id=176 bgcolor=#fefefe
| 35176 ||  || — || October 10, 1993 || Palomar || H. E. Holt || V || align=right | 1.6 km || 
|-id=177 bgcolor=#d6d6d6
| 35177 ||  || — || October 9, 1993 || La Silla || E. W. Elst || — || align=right | 9.1 km || 
|-id=178 bgcolor=#d6d6d6
| 35178 ||  || — || October 9, 1993 || La Silla || E. W. Elst || — || align=right | 9.8 km || 
|-id=179 bgcolor=#fefefe
| 35179 ||  || — || October 9, 1993 || La Silla || E. W. Elst || NYS || align=right | 2.4 km || 
|-id=180 bgcolor=#fefefe
| 35180 ||  || — || October 9, 1993 || La Silla || E. W. Elst || FLO || align=right | 2.5 km || 
|-id=181 bgcolor=#fefefe
| 35181 ||  || — || October 9, 1993 || La Silla || E. W. Elst || — || align=right | 2.2 km || 
|-id=182 bgcolor=#fefefe
| 35182 ||  || — || October 20, 1993 || Kitt Peak || Spacewatch || — || align=right | 2.0 km || 
|-id=183 bgcolor=#d6d6d6
| 35183 ||  || — || October 20, 1993 || Siding Spring || R. H. McNaught || ALA || align=right | 16 km || 
|-id=184 bgcolor=#fefefe
| 35184 ||  || — || October 20, 1993 || La Silla || E. W. Elst || — || align=right | 2.0 km || 
|-id=185 bgcolor=#E9E9E9
| 35185 || 1993 VS || — || November 14, 1993 || Oizumi || T. Kobayashi || — || align=right | 3.4 km || 
|-id=186 bgcolor=#fefefe
| 35186 ||  || — || November 11, 1993 || Kushiro || S. Ueda, H. Kaneda || NYS || align=right | 2.5 km || 
|-id=187 bgcolor=#fefefe
| 35187 ||  || — || November 11, 1993 || Kushiro || S. Ueda, H. Kaneda || — || align=right | 6.9 km || 
|-id=188 bgcolor=#E9E9E9
| 35188 ||  || — || November 11, 1993 || Kushiro || S. Ueda, H. Kaneda || — || align=right | 4.9 km || 
|-id=189 bgcolor=#fefefe
| 35189 || 1994 AE || — || January 2, 1994 || Oizumi || T. Kobayashi || — || align=right | 3.0 km || 
|-id=190 bgcolor=#E9E9E9
| 35190 || 1994 AW || — || January 4, 1994 || Oizumi || T. Kobayashi || — || align=right | 6.0 km || 
|-id=191 bgcolor=#E9E9E9
| 35191 ||  || — || February 10, 1994 || Kitt Peak || Spacewatch || — || align=right | 3.6 km || 
|-id=192 bgcolor=#E9E9E9
| 35192 ||  || — || February 12, 1994 || Kitt Peak || Spacewatch || — || align=right | 4.3 km || 
|-id=193 bgcolor=#fefefe
| 35193 ||  || — || February 8, 1994 || La Silla || E. W. Elst || — || align=right | 5.5 km || 
|-id=194 bgcolor=#fefefe
| 35194 ||  || — || March 10, 1994 || Palomar || E. F. Helin || H || align=right | 2.1 km || 
|-id=195 bgcolor=#E9E9E9
| 35195 ||  || — || May 3, 1994 || Kitt Peak || Spacewatch || — || align=right | 4.4 km || 
|-id=196 bgcolor=#E9E9E9
| 35196 ||  || — || May 11, 1994 || Kitt Peak || Spacewatch || HOF || align=right | 6.1 km || 
|-id=197 bgcolor=#E9E9E9
| 35197 Longmire || 1994 LH ||  || June 7, 1994 || Farra d'Isonzo || Farra d'Isonzo || — || align=right | 6.6 km || 
|-id=198 bgcolor=#fefefe
| 35198 ||  || — || August 9, 1994 || Siding Spring || R. H. McNaught || H || align=right | 1.7 km || 
|-id=199 bgcolor=#E9E9E9
| 35199 ||  || — || August 10, 1994 || La Silla || E. W. Elst || — || align=right | 6.0 km || 
|-id=200 bgcolor=#d6d6d6
| 35200 ||  || — || August 10, 1994 || La Silla || E. W. Elst || — || align=right | 7.9 km || 
|}

35201–35300 

|-bgcolor=#d6d6d6
| 35201 ||  || — || August 10, 1994 || La Silla || E. W. Elst || THM || align=right | 6.4 km || 
|-id=202 bgcolor=#d6d6d6
| 35202 ||  || — || August 10, 1994 || La Silla || E. W. Elst || THM || align=right | 6.7 km || 
|-id=203 bgcolor=#d6d6d6
| 35203 ||  || — || August 10, 1994 || La Silla || E. W. Elst || EOS || align=right | 4.2 km || 
|-id=204 bgcolor=#d6d6d6
| 35204 ||  || — || August 10, 1994 || La Silla || E. W. Elst || CHA || align=right | 7.6 km || 
|-id=205 bgcolor=#d6d6d6
| 35205 ||  || — || August 10, 1994 || La Silla || E. W. Elst || — || align=right | 3.4 km || 
|-id=206 bgcolor=#d6d6d6
| 35206 ||  || — || August 12, 1994 || La Silla || E. W. Elst || KOR || align=right | 4.3 km || 
|-id=207 bgcolor=#d6d6d6
| 35207 ||  || — || August 10, 1994 || La Silla || E. W. Elst || EOS || align=right | 4.9 km || 
|-id=208 bgcolor=#d6d6d6
| 35208 ||  || — || August 10, 1994 || La Silla || E. W. Elst || EOS || align=right | 5.2 km || 
|-id=209 bgcolor=#d6d6d6
| 35209 ||  || — || August 10, 1994 || La Silla || E. W. Elst || EOS || align=right | 4.0 km || 
|-id=210 bgcolor=#fefefe
| 35210 ||  || — || August 10, 1994 || La Silla || E. W. Elst || — || align=right | 2.2 km || 
|-id=211 bgcolor=#d6d6d6
| 35211 ||  || — || September 2, 1994 || Kitt Peak || Spacewatch || — || align=right | 5.4 km || 
|-id=212 bgcolor=#d6d6d6
| 35212 ||  || — || September 3, 1994 || La Silla || E. W. Elst || KOR || align=right | 3.8 km || 
|-id=213 bgcolor=#d6d6d6
| 35213 ||  || — || September 12, 1994 || Xinglong || SCAP || — || align=right | 9.5 km || 
|-id=214 bgcolor=#d6d6d6
| 35214 ||  || — || September 28, 1994 || Kitt Peak || Spacewatch || THM || align=right | 5.1 km || 
|-id=215 bgcolor=#d6d6d6
| 35215 ||  || — || September 28, 1994 || Kitt Peak || Spacewatch || KOR || align=right | 6.0 km || 
|-id=216 bgcolor=#d6d6d6
| 35216 ||  || — || October 26, 1994 || Kitt Peak || Spacewatch || THM || align=right | 7.3 km || 
|-id=217 bgcolor=#fefefe
| 35217 ||  || — || November 4, 1994 || Oizumi || T. Kobayashi || — || align=right | 2.5 km || 
|-id=218 bgcolor=#fefefe
| 35218 ||  || — || November 30, 1994 || Oizumi || T. Kobayashi || — || align=right | 2.6 km || 
|-id=219 bgcolor=#fefefe
| 35219 ||  || — || November 30, 1994 || Oizumi || T. Kobayashi || — || align=right | 3.6 km || 
|-id=220 bgcolor=#d6d6d6
| 35220 ||  || — || November 28, 1994 || Kitt Peak || Spacewatch || — || align=right | 9.6 km || 
|-id=221 bgcolor=#fefefe
| 35221 ||  || — || December 7, 1994 || Oizumi || T. Kobayashi || MAS || align=right | 2.3 km || 
|-id=222 bgcolor=#fefefe
| 35222 Delbarrio ||  ||  || December 4, 1994 || Cima Ekar || M. Tombelli || V || align=right | 2.6 km || 
|-id=223 bgcolor=#fefefe
| 35223 || 1995 BR || — || January 23, 1995 || Oizumi || T. Kobayashi || — || align=right | 2.4 km || 
|-id=224 bgcolor=#fefefe
| 35224 ||  || — || January 25, 1995 || Oizumi || T. Kobayashi || — || align=right | 2.2 km || 
|-id=225 bgcolor=#fefefe
| 35225 ||  || — || February 24, 1995 || Kitt Peak || Spacewatch || MAS || align=right | 2.1 km || 
|-id=226 bgcolor=#fefefe
| 35226 ||  || — || March 23, 1995 || Kitt Peak || Spacewatch || NYS || align=right | 2.1 km || 
|-id=227 bgcolor=#fefefe
| 35227 ||  || — || March 23, 1995 || Kitt Peak || Spacewatch || — || align=right | 2.1 km || 
|-id=228 bgcolor=#E9E9E9
| 35228 ||  || — || March 27, 1995 || Kitt Peak || Spacewatch || — || align=right | 2.1 km || 
|-id=229 bgcolor=#fefefe
| 35229 Benckert ||  ||  || March 24, 1995 || Tautenburg Observatory || F. Börngen || V || align=right | 3.4 km || 
|-id=230 bgcolor=#fefefe
| 35230 || 1995 GW || — || April 7, 1995 || Oizumi || T. Kobayashi || — || align=right | 4.4 km || 
|-id=231 bgcolor=#fefefe
| 35231 ||  || — || April 4, 1995 || Kitami || K. Endate, K. Watanabe || — || align=right | 4.2 km || 
|-id=232 bgcolor=#fefefe
| 35232 ||  || — || April 4, 1995 || Xinglong || SCAP || — || align=right | 2.6 km || 
|-id=233 bgcolor=#E9E9E9
| 35233 Krčín || 1995 KJ ||  || May 26, 1995 || Kleť || J. Tichá, M. Tichý || — || align=right | 2.1 km || 
|-id=234 bgcolor=#E9E9E9
| 35234 || 1995 NH || — || July 1, 1995 || Kitt Peak || Spacewatch || EUN || align=right | 3.3 km || 
|-id=235 bgcolor=#E9E9E9
| 35235 ||  || — || July 25, 1995 || Kitt Peak || Spacewatch || DOR || align=right | 5.9 km || 
|-id=236 bgcolor=#E9E9E9
| 35236 ||  || — || August 2, 1995 || Kitt Peak || Spacewatch || — || align=right | 2.5 km || 
|-id=237 bgcolor=#E9E9E9
| 35237 Matzner || 1995 QP ||  || August 23, 1995 || Ondřejov || L. Kotková || DOR || align=right | 6.6 km || 
|-id=238 bgcolor=#E9E9E9
| 35238 ||  || — || August 20, 1995 || Xinglong || SCAP || — || align=right | 3.3 km || 
|-id=239 bgcolor=#d6d6d6
| 35239 Ottoseydl ||  ||  || September 25, 1995 || Kleť || M. Tichý, Z. Moravec || KOR || align=right | 2.7 km || 
|-id=240 bgcolor=#d6d6d6
| 35240 ||  || — || September 17, 1995 || Kitt Peak || Spacewatch || — || align=right | 5.5 km || 
|-id=241 bgcolor=#d6d6d6
| 35241 ||  || — || September 25, 1995 || Kitt Peak || Spacewatch || KOR || align=right | 2.4 km || 
|-id=242 bgcolor=#d6d6d6
| 35242 ||  || — || September 29, 1995 || Kitt Peak || Spacewatch || — || align=right | 5.1 km || 
|-id=243 bgcolor=#E9E9E9
| 35243 ||  || — || October 14, 1995 || Xinglong || SCAP || — || align=right | 3.9 km || 
|-id=244 bgcolor=#d6d6d6
| 35244 ||  || — || October 15, 1995 || Kitt Peak || Spacewatch || — || align=right | 3.9 km || 
|-id=245 bgcolor=#E9E9E9
| 35245 ||  || — || October 17, 1995 || Kitt Peak || Spacewatch || — || align=right | 5.4 km || 
|-id=246 bgcolor=#d6d6d6
| 35246 ||  || — || October 17, 1995 || Kitt Peak || Spacewatch || — || align=right | 6.0 km || 
|-id=247 bgcolor=#E9E9E9
| 35247 ||  || — || October 19, 1995 || Kitt Peak || Spacewatch || — || align=right | 4.8 km || 
|-id=248 bgcolor=#d6d6d6
| 35248 ||  || — || October 21, 1995 || Kitt Peak || Spacewatch || — || align=right | 9.3 km || 
|-id=249 bgcolor=#d6d6d6
| 35249 ||  || — || November 21, 1995 || Farra d'Isonzo || Farra d'Isonzo || KOR || align=right | 4.5 km || 
|-id=250 bgcolor=#E9E9E9
| 35250 ||  || — || November 19, 1995 || Kitt Peak || Spacewatch || — || align=right | 4.6 km || 
|-id=251 bgcolor=#d6d6d6
| 35251 ||  || — || December 16, 1995 || Kitt Peak || Spacewatch || KOR || align=right | 3.1 km || 
|-id=252 bgcolor=#d6d6d6
| 35252 ||  || — || December 20, 1995 || Kitt Peak || Spacewatch || — || align=right | 6.0 km || 
|-id=253 bgcolor=#d6d6d6
| 35253 ||  || — || January 12, 1996 || Kitt Peak || Spacewatch || — || align=right | 8.4 km || 
|-id=254 bgcolor=#d6d6d6
| 35254 ||  || — || January 26, 1996 || Uto || F. Uto || TIR || align=right | 5.3 km || 
|-id=255 bgcolor=#fefefe
| 35255 ||  || — || January 19, 1996 || Kitt Peak || Spacewatch || — || align=right | 2.1 km || 
|-id=256 bgcolor=#d6d6d6
| 35256 ||  || — || February 23, 1996 || Višnjan Observatory || Višnjan Obs. || — || align=right | 5.2 km || 
|-id=257 bgcolor=#fefefe
| 35257 ||  || — || April 17, 1996 || La Silla || E. W. Elst || NYS || align=right | 1.8 km || 
|-id=258 bgcolor=#fefefe
| 35258 ||  || — || April 20, 1996 || La Silla || E. W. Elst || — || align=right | 4.3 km || 
|-id=259 bgcolor=#fefefe
| 35259 ||  || — || April 20, 1996 || La Silla || E. W. Elst || FLOslow? || align=right | 5.6 km || 
|-id=260 bgcolor=#fefefe
| 35260 ||  || — || April 20, 1996 || La Silla || E. W. Elst || — || align=right | 4.5 km || 
|-id=261 bgcolor=#fefefe
| 35261 ||  || — || May 11, 1996 || Kitt Peak || Spacewatch || — || align=right | 2.0 km || 
|-id=262 bgcolor=#fefefe
| 35262 ||  || — || July 15, 1996 || Haleakala || NEAT || — || align=right | 3.8 km || 
|-id=263 bgcolor=#E9E9E9
| 35263 ||  || — || July 14, 1996 || La Silla || E. W. Elst || — || align=right | 3.2 km || 
|-id=264 bgcolor=#fefefe
| 35264 ||  || — || July 14, 1996 || La Silla || E. W. Elst || V || align=right | 2.4 km || 
|-id=265 bgcolor=#fefefe
| 35265 Takeosaitou ||  ||  || July 12, 1996 || Nanyo || T. Okuni || V || align=right | 2.8 km || 
|-id=266 bgcolor=#fefefe
| 35266 ||  || — || August 9, 1996 || Haleakala || NEAT || FLO || align=right | 2.3 km || 
|-id=267 bgcolor=#fefefe
| 35267 ||  || — || August 8, 1996 || La Silla || E. W. Elst || — || align=right | 1.9 km || 
|-id=268 bgcolor=#fefefe
| 35268 Panoramix || 1996 QY ||  || August 19, 1996 || Kleť || M. Tichý || — || align=right | 2.0 km || 
|-id=269 bgcolor=#fefefe
| 35269 Idefix ||  ||  || August 21, 1996 || Kleť || M. Tichý, J. Tichá || — || align=right | 3.1 km || 
|-id=270 bgcolor=#fefefe
| 35270 Molinari || 1996 RL ||  || September 7, 1996 || Sormano || V. Giuliani, P. Chiavenna || ERI || align=right | 5.0 km || 
|-id=271 bgcolor=#fefefe
| 35271 ||  || — || September 13, 1996 || Haleakala || NEAT || — || align=right | 2.8 km || 
|-id=272 bgcolor=#C2FFFF
| 35272 ||  || — || September 7, 1996 || Kitt Peak || Spacewatch || L4 || align=right | 21 km || 
|-id=273 bgcolor=#E9E9E9
| 35273 ||  || — || September 8, 1996 || Kitt Peak || Spacewatch || — || align=right | 2.1 km || 
|-id=274 bgcolor=#fefefe
| 35274 Kenziarino ||  ||  || September 7, 1996 || Nanyo || T. Okuni || FLO || align=right | 2.5 km || 
|-id=275 bgcolor=#fefefe
| 35275 ||  || — || September 11, 1996 || Kitt Peak || Spacewatch || NYS || align=right | 1.7 km || 
|-id=276 bgcolor=#C2FFFF
| 35276 ||  || — || September 13, 1996 || Haleakala || NEAT || L4 || align=right | 25 km || 
|-id=277 bgcolor=#C2FFFF
| 35277 ||  || — || September 10, 1996 || La Silla || UDTS || L4 || align=right | 23 km || 
|-id=278 bgcolor=#fefefe
| 35278 || 1996 SM || — || September 16, 1996 || Prescott || P. G. Comba || V || align=right | 1.5 km || 
|-id=279 bgcolor=#E9E9E9
| 35279 || 1996 SR || — || September 20, 1996 || Rand || G. R. Viscome || — || align=right | 2.5 km || 
|-id=280 bgcolor=#E9E9E9
| 35280 ||  || — || September 17, 1996 || Kitt Peak || Spacewatch || — || align=right | 2.0 km || 
|-id=281 bgcolor=#E9E9E9
| 35281 ||  || — || September 18, 1996 || Xinglong || SCAP || — || align=right | 2.1 km || 
|-id=282 bgcolor=#E9E9E9
| 35282 ||  || — || September 21, 1996 || Xinglong || SCAP || — || align=right | 3.7 km || 
|-id=283 bgcolor=#E9E9E9
| 35283 Bradtimerson ||  ||  || October 5, 1996 || Rand || G. R. Viscome || — || align=right | 3.5 km || 
|-id=284 bgcolor=#fefefe
| 35284 ||  || — || October 5, 1996 || King City, Ontario Observatory || R. G. Sandness || V || align=right | 2.6 km || 
|-id=285 bgcolor=#fefefe
| 35285 ||  || — || October 6, 1996 || Catalina Station || C. W. Hergenrother || PHO || align=right | 3.6 km || 
|-id=286 bgcolor=#E9E9E9
| 35286 Takaoakihiro ||  ||  || October 14, 1996 || Yatsuka || H. Abe || ADEslow || align=right | 8.9 km || 
|-id=287 bgcolor=#fefefe
| 35287 ||  || — || October 4, 1996 || Kitt Peak || Spacewatch || — || align=right | 2.6 km || 
|-id=288 bgcolor=#E9E9E9
| 35288 ||  || — || October 4, 1996 || Kitt Peak || Spacewatch || — || align=right | 3.3 km || 
|-id=289 bgcolor=#E9E9E9
| 35289 ||  || — || October 8, 1996 || La Silla || E. W. Elst || — || align=right | 5.3 km || 
|-id=290 bgcolor=#fefefe
| 35290 ||  || — || October 8, 1996 || La Silla || E. W. Elst || — || align=right | 3.4 km || 
|-id=291 bgcolor=#E9E9E9
| 35291 ||  || — || October 10, 1996 || Kitt Peak || Spacewatch || MIT || align=right | 5.9 km || 
|-id=292 bgcolor=#fefefe
| 35292 ||  || — || October 11, 1996 || Kitt Peak || Spacewatch || — || align=right | 3.5 km || 
|-id=293 bgcolor=#E9E9E9
| 35293 ||  || — || October 5, 1996 || La Silla || E. W. Elst || — || align=right | 2.5 km || 
|-id=294 bgcolor=#E9E9E9
| 35294 ||  || — || October 29, 1996 || Xinglong || SCAP || — || align=right | 3.3 km || 
|-id=295 bgcolor=#E9E9E9
| 35295 Omo || 1996 VM ||  || November 1, 1996 || Colleverde || V. S. Casulli || EUN || align=right | 4.3 km || 
|-id=296 bgcolor=#E9E9E9
| 35296 ||  || — || November 1, 1996 || Xinglong || SCAP || MIT || align=right | 6.9 km || 
|-id=297 bgcolor=#fefefe
| 35297 ||  || — || November 2, 1996 || Xinglong || SCAP || NYS || align=right | 2.1 km || 
|-id=298 bgcolor=#E9E9E9
| 35298 ||  || — || November 3, 1996 || Kitami || K. Endate, K. Watanabe || — || align=right | 4.5 km || 
|-id=299 bgcolor=#E9E9E9
| 35299 ||  || — || November 7, 1996 || Kitami || K. Endate, K. Watanabe || — || align=right | 5.7 km || 
|-id=300 bgcolor=#E9E9E9
| 35300 ||  || — || November 6, 1996 || Kitt Peak || Spacewatch || — || align=right | 2.4 km || 
|}

35301–35400 

|-bgcolor=#E9E9E9
| 35301 || 1996 XE || — || December 1, 1996 || Oohira || T. Urata || — || align=right | 6.3 km || 
|-id=302 bgcolor=#d6d6d6
| 35302 ||  || — || December 7, 1996 || Oizumi || T. Kobayashi || URS || align=right | 9.5 km || 
|-id=303 bgcolor=#E9E9E9
| 35303 ||  || — || December 1, 1996 || Kitt Peak || Spacewatch || — || align=right | 3.6 km || 
|-id=304 bgcolor=#d6d6d6
| 35304 ||  || — || December 4, 1996 || Kitt Peak || Spacewatch || KOR || align=right | 2.9 km || 
|-id=305 bgcolor=#d6d6d6
| 35305 ||  || — || December 4, 1996 || Kitt Peak || Spacewatch || KOR || align=right | 3.0 km || 
|-id=306 bgcolor=#E9E9E9
| 35306 ||  || — || December 5, 1996 || Kitt Peak || Spacewatch || — || align=right | 6.7 km || 
|-id=307 bgcolor=#E9E9E9
| 35307 ||  || — || December 4, 1996 || Kitt Peak || Spacewatch || — || align=right | 5.0 km || 
|-id=308 bgcolor=#E9E9E9
| 35308 ||  || — || December 4, 1996 || Kitt Peak || Spacewatch || — || align=right | 5.3 km || 
|-id=309 bgcolor=#E9E9E9
| 35309 ||  || — || December 24, 1996 || Xinglong || SCAP || MAR || align=right | 4.1 km || 
|-id=310 bgcolor=#d6d6d6
| 35310 ||  || — || January 3, 1997 || Oizumi || T. Kobayashi || FIR || align=right | 15 km || 
|-id=311 bgcolor=#d6d6d6
| 35311 ||  || — || January 3, 1997 || Oizumi || T. Kobayashi || EOS || align=right | 6.5 km || 
|-id=312 bgcolor=#E9E9E9
| 35312 ||  || — || January 4, 1997 || Oizumi || T. Kobayashi || DOR || align=right | 5.2 km || 
|-id=313 bgcolor=#d6d6d6
| 35313 Hangtianyuan ||  ||  || January 2, 1997 || Xinglong || SCAP || KOR || align=right | 4.0 km || 
|-id=314 bgcolor=#d6d6d6
| 35314 ||  || — || January 2, 1997 || Kitt Peak || Spacewatch || — || align=right | 12 km || 
|-id=315 bgcolor=#d6d6d6
| 35315 ||  || — || January 3, 1997 || Kitt Peak || Spacewatch || KOR || align=right | 3.5 km || 
|-id=316 bgcolor=#E9E9E9
| 35316 Monella ||  ||  || January 11, 1997 || Sormano || P. Sicoli, M. Cavagna || — || align=right | 4.2 km || 
|-id=317 bgcolor=#d6d6d6
| 35317 ||  || — || January 14, 1997 || Xinglong || SCAP || BRA || align=right | 4.0 km || 
|-id=318 bgcolor=#E9E9E9
| 35318 ||  || — || January 25, 1997 || Xinglong || SCAP || — || align=right | 5.1 km || 
|-id=319 bgcolor=#E9E9E9
| 35319 ||  || — || January 31, 1997 || Kitt Peak || Spacewatch || — || align=right | 4.5 km || 
|-id=320 bgcolor=#E9E9E9
| 35320 ||  || — || January 30, 1997 || Črni Vrh || H. Mikuž || EUN || align=right | 3.6 km || 
|-id=321 bgcolor=#d6d6d6
| 35321 ||  || — || February 1, 1997 || Kitt Peak || Spacewatch || URS || align=right | 8.3 km || 
|-id=322 bgcolor=#d6d6d6
| 35322 ||  || — || February 6, 1997 || Chichibu || N. Satō || EOS || align=right | 8.1 km || 
|-id=323 bgcolor=#d6d6d6
| 35323 ||  || — || February 13, 1997 || Oohira || T. Urata || EOS || align=right | 4.1 km || 
|-id=324 bgcolor=#d6d6d6
| 35324 Orlandi ||  ||  || March 7, 1997 || Bologna || San Vittore Obs. || — || align=right | 12 km || 
|-id=325 bgcolor=#d6d6d6
| 35325 Claudiaguarnieri ||  ||  || March 7, 1997 || Bologna || San Vittore Obs. || — || align=right | 5.8 km || 
|-id=326 bgcolor=#d6d6d6
| 35326 Lucastrabla ||  ||  || March 7, 1997 || Bologna || San Vittore Obs. || THM || align=right | 5.6 km || 
|-id=327 bgcolor=#d6d6d6
| 35327 ||  || — || March 3, 1997 || Kitt Peak || Spacewatch || — || align=right | 5.8 km || 
|-id=328 bgcolor=#d6d6d6
| 35328 ||  || — || March 4, 1997 || Kitt Peak || Spacewatch || — || align=right | 7.9 km || 
|-id=329 bgcolor=#d6d6d6
| 35329 ||  || — || March 4, 1997 || Socorro || LINEAR || — || align=right | 6.4 km || 
|-id=330 bgcolor=#d6d6d6
| 35330 ||  || — || March 4, 1997 || Socorro || LINEAR || — || align=right | 5.7 km || 
|-id=331 bgcolor=#d6d6d6
| 35331 ||  || — || March 12, 1997 || La Silla || E. W. Elst || — || align=right | 9.0 km || 
|-id=332 bgcolor=#d6d6d6
| 35332 ||  || — || March 8, 1997 || La Silla || E. W. Elst || — || align=right | 6.8 km || 
|-id=333 bgcolor=#d6d6d6
| 35333 ||  || — || March 10, 1997 || La Silla || E. W. Elst || — || align=right | 6.9 km || 
|-id=334 bgcolor=#d6d6d6
| 35334 Yarkovsky ||  ||  || March 31, 1997 || Sormano || P. Sicoli, F. Manca || — || align=right | 3.9 km || 
|-id=335 bgcolor=#d6d6d6
| 35335 ||  || — || March 30, 1997 || Kitt Peak || Spacewatch || — || align=right | 11 km || 
|-id=336 bgcolor=#d6d6d6
| 35336 ||  || — || March 31, 1997 || Socorro || LINEAR || URS || align=right | 16 km || 
|-id=337 bgcolor=#d6d6d6
| 35337 ||  || — || March 31, 1997 || Socorro || LINEAR || EOS || align=right | 5.0 km || 
|-id=338 bgcolor=#d6d6d6
| 35338 ||  || — || April 2, 1997 || Socorro || LINEAR || — || align=right | 7.9 km || 
|-id=339 bgcolor=#d6d6d6
| 35339 ||  || — || April 3, 1997 || Socorro || LINEAR || KOR || align=right | 6.4 km || 
|-id=340 bgcolor=#d6d6d6
| 35340 ||  || — || April 3, 1997 || Socorro || LINEAR || HYG || align=right | 9.7 km || 
|-id=341 bgcolor=#d6d6d6
| 35341 ||  || — || April 6, 1997 || Socorro || LINEAR || EOS || align=right | 8.0 km || 
|-id=342 bgcolor=#d6d6d6
| 35342 ||  || — || April 7, 1997 || Goodricke-Pigott || M. T. Chamberlin || — || align=right | 8.8 km || 
|-id=343 bgcolor=#d6d6d6
| 35343 ||  || — || April 3, 1997 || Kitami || K. Endate, K. Watanabe || THM || align=right | 6.9 km || 
|-id=344 bgcolor=#d6d6d6
| 35344 ||  || — || April 30, 1997 || Socorro || LINEAR || — || align=right | 12 km || 
|-id=345 bgcolor=#d6d6d6
| 35345 ||  || — || April 30, 1997 || Socorro || LINEAR || EOS || align=right | 6.8 km || 
|-id=346 bgcolor=#d6d6d6
| 35346 Ivanoferri || 1997 JX ||  || May 1, 1997 || Bologna || San Vittore Obs. || VER || align=right | 7.2 km || 
|-id=347 bgcolor=#d6d6d6
| 35347 Tallinn ||  ||  || May 3, 1997 || La Silla || E. W. Elst || EOS || align=right | 10 km || 
|-id=348 bgcolor=#d6d6d6
| 35348 ||  || — || May 8, 1997 || Burlington || T. Handley || TIR || align=right | 10 km || 
|-id=349 bgcolor=#d6d6d6
| 35349 ||  || — || June 7, 1997 || La Silla || E. W. Elst || HYG || align=right | 8.3 km || 
|-id=350 bgcolor=#d6d6d6
| 35350 Lespaul ||  ||  || June 8, 1997 || La Silla || E. W. Elst || HYG || align=right | 9.3 km || 
|-id=351 bgcolor=#fefefe
| 35351 ||  || — || June 28, 1997 || Socorro || LINEAR || — || align=right | 1.7 km || 
|-id=352 bgcolor=#fefefe
| 35352 Texas ||  ||  || August 7, 1997 || Needville || W. G. Dillon, R. Pepper || NYS || align=right | 1.3 km || 
|-id=353 bgcolor=#fefefe
| 35353 ||  || — || September 8, 1997 || Ondřejov || P. Pravec || — || align=right | 3.0 km || 
|-id=354 bgcolor=#fefefe
| 35354 ||  || — || September 22, 1997 || Farra d'Isonzo || Farra d'Isonzo || — || align=right | 4.5 km || 
|-id=355 bgcolor=#fefefe
| 35355 ||  || — || September 23, 1997 || Ondřejov || P. Pravec || — || align=right | 2.1 km || 
|-id=356 bgcolor=#fefefe
| 35356 Vondrák ||  ||  || September 25, 1997 || Ondřejov || P. Pravec, L. Kotková || — || align=right | 1.7 km || 
|-id=357 bgcolor=#fefefe
| 35357 Haraldlesch ||  ||  || September 28, 1997 || Starkenburg Observatory || Starkenburg Obs. || — || align=right | 2.0 km || 
|-id=358 bgcolor=#fefefe
| 35358 Lorifini ||  ||  || September 27, 1997 || San Marcello || L. Tesi, M. Tombelli || CHL || align=right | 5.9 km || 
|-id=359 bgcolor=#fefefe
| 35359 ||  || — || September 26, 1997 || Xinglong || SCAP || — || align=right | 2.6 km || 
|-id=360 bgcolor=#fefefe
| 35360 ||  || — || October 7, 1997 || Xinglong || SCAP || — || align=right | 3.1 km || 
|-id=361 bgcolor=#fefefe
| 35361 ||  || — || October 11, 1997 || Xinglong || SCAP || — || align=right | 1.6 km || 
|-id=362 bgcolor=#fefefe
| 35362 ||  || — || October 7, 1997 || Xinglong || SCAP || — || align=right | 2.5 km || 
|-id=363 bgcolor=#C2FFFF
| 35363 ||  || — || October 6, 1997 || La Silla || UDTS || L4 || align=right | 19 km || 
|-id=364 bgcolor=#fefefe
| 35364 Donaldpray || 1997 UT ||  || October 21, 1997 || Ondřejov || P. Pravec || — || align=right | 2.7 km || 
|-id=365 bgcolor=#fefefe
| 35365 Cooney || 1997 UU ||  || October 21, 1997 || Ondřejov || P. Pravec || V || align=right | 1.4 km || 
|-id=366 bgcolor=#fefefe
| 35366 Kaifeng ||  ||  || October 18, 1997 || Xinglong || SCAP || — || align=right | 1.9 km || 
|-id=367 bgcolor=#fefefe
| 35367 ||  || — || October 28, 1997 || Ondřejov || L. Kotková || EUT || align=right | 1.4 km || 
|-id=368 bgcolor=#FA8072
| 35368 ||  || — || October 28, 1997 || Haleakala || NEAT || — || align=right | 2.4 km || 
|-id=369 bgcolor=#fefefe
| 35369 ||  || — || October 29, 1997 || Haleakala || NEAT || — || align=right | 12 km || 
|-id=370 bgcolor=#fefefe
| 35370 Daisakyu ||  ||  || October 29, 1997 || Saji || Saji Obs. || FLO || align=right | 2.9 km || 
|-id=371 bgcolor=#fefefe
| 35371 Yokonozaki ||  ||  || October 25, 1997 || Nyukasa || M. Hirasawa, S. Suzuki || — || align=right | 3.3 km || 
|-id=372 bgcolor=#fefefe
| 35372 ||  || — || October 28, 1997 || Xinglong || SCAP || — || align=right | 2.2 km || 
|-id=373 bgcolor=#fefefe
| 35373 ||  || — || October 25, 1997 || La Silla || UDTS || NYS || align=right | 1.7 km || 
|-id=374 bgcolor=#fefefe
| 35374 || 1997 VK || — || November 1, 1997 || Prescott || P. G. Comba || V || align=right | 1.8 km || 
|-id=375 bgcolor=#E9E9E9
| 35375 ||  || — || November 1, 1997 || Kushiro || S. Ueda, H. Kaneda || — || align=right | 5.6 km || 
|-id=376 bgcolor=#fefefe
| 35376 ||  || — || November 8, 1997 || Oizumi || T. Kobayashi || FLO || align=right | 2.7 km || 
|-id=377 bgcolor=#fefefe
| 35377 ||  || — || November 23, 1997 || Oizumi || T. Kobayashi || NYS || align=right | 1.8 km || 
|-id=378 bgcolor=#fefefe
| 35378 ||  || — || November 23, 1997 || Kitt Peak || Spacewatch || — || align=right | 2.3 km || 
|-id=379 bgcolor=#fefefe
| 35379 ||  || — || November 25, 1997 || Kitt Peak || Spacewatch || — || align=right | 1.9 km || 
|-id=380 bgcolor=#fefefe
| 35380 ||  || — || November 30, 1997 || Oizumi || T. Kobayashi || — || align=right | 2.8 km || 
|-id=381 bgcolor=#fefefe
| 35381 ||  || — || November 29, 1997 || Socorro || LINEAR || NYS || align=right | 1.6 km || 
|-id=382 bgcolor=#fefefe
| 35382 ||  || — || November 29, 1997 || Socorro || LINEAR || — || align=right | 2.4 km || 
|-id=383 bgcolor=#fefefe
| 35383 ||  || — || November 29, 1997 || Socorro || LINEAR || — || align=right | 2.6 km || 
|-id=384 bgcolor=#fefefe
| 35384 ||  || — || November 29, 1997 || Socorro || LINEAR || NYS || align=right | 1.9 km || 
|-id=385 bgcolor=#fefefe
| 35385 ||  || — || November 29, 1997 || Socorro || LINEAR || NYS || align=right | 1.5 km || 
|-id=386 bgcolor=#fefefe
| 35386 ||  || — || November 29, 1997 || Socorro || LINEAR || — || align=right | 3.4 km || 
|-id=387 bgcolor=#fefefe
| 35387 ||  || — || November 29, 1997 || Socorro || LINEAR || NYS || align=right | 1.9 km || 
|-id=388 bgcolor=#fefefe
| 35388 ||  || — || November 25, 1997 || Kitt Peak || Spacewatch || FLO || align=right | 1.8 km || 
|-id=389 bgcolor=#fefefe
| 35389 || 1997 XO || — || December 3, 1997 || Oizumi || T. Kobayashi || fast? || align=right | 4.2 km || 
|-id=390 bgcolor=#fefefe
| 35390 || 1997 XW || — || December 3, 1997 || Oizumi || T. Kobayashi || FLO || align=right | 2.3 km || 
|-id=391 bgcolor=#fefefe
| 35391 Uzan ||  ||  || December 3, 1997 || Caussols || ODAS || NYS || align=right | 5.1 km || 
|-id=392 bgcolor=#fefefe
| 35392 ||  || — || December 6, 1997 || Caussols || ODAS || — || align=right | 2.6 km || 
|-id=393 bgcolor=#fefefe
| 35393 ||  || — || December 2, 1997 || Nachi-Katsuura || Y. Shimizu, T. Urata || FLO || align=right | 2.8 km || 
|-id=394 bgcolor=#E9E9E9
| 35394 Countbasie ||  ||  || December 7, 1997 || Caussols || CERGA || CLO || align=right | 6.3 km || 
|-id=395 bgcolor=#fefefe
| 35395 ||  || — || December 4, 1997 || Gekko || T. Kagawa, T. Urata || NYS || align=right | 2.2 km || 
|-id=396 bgcolor=#FFC2E0
| 35396 ||  || — || December 6, 1997 || Kitt Peak || Spacewatch || APO +1kmPHA || align=right data-sort-value="0.7" | 700 m || 
|-id=397 bgcolor=#fefefe
| 35397 || 1997 YJ || — || December 18, 1997 || Oizumi || T. Kobayashi || NYS || align=right | 2.6 km || 
|-id=398 bgcolor=#fefefe
| 35398 || 1997 YR || — || December 20, 1997 || Oizumi || T. Kobayashi || — || align=right | 5.4 km || 
|-id=399 bgcolor=#fefefe
| 35399 ||  || — || December 20, 1997 || Xinglong || SCAP || — || align=right | 2.2 km || 
|-id=400 bgcolor=#fefefe
| 35400 ||  || — || December 21, 1997 || Chichibu || N. Satō || NYS || align=right | 2.3 km || 
|}

35401–35500 

|-bgcolor=#fefefe
| 35401 ||  || — || December 21, 1997 || Chichibu || N. Satō || NYS || align=right | 4.0 km || 
|-id=402 bgcolor=#fefefe
| 35402 ||  || — || December 17, 1997 || Xinglong || SCAP || — || align=right | 3.0 km || 
|-id=403 bgcolor=#fefefe
| 35403 Latimer ||  ||  || December 22, 1997 || Needville || C. Gustava, K. Rivich || V || align=right | 2.0 km || 
|-id=404 bgcolor=#fefefe
| 35404 ||  || — || December 25, 1997 || Oizumi || T. Kobayashi || — || align=right | 5.4 km || 
|-id=405 bgcolor=#fefefe
| 35405 ||  || — || December 21, 1997 || Kitt Peak || Spacewatch || MAS || align=right | 2.3 km || 
|-id=406 bgcolor=#fefefe
| 35406 ||  || — || December 28, 1997 || Haleakala || NEAT || — || align=right | 5.0 km || 
|-id=407 bgcolor=#fefefe
| 35407 ||  || — || December 28, 1997 || Haleakala || NEAT || — || align=right | 3.5 km || 
|-id=408 bgcolor=#fefefe
| 35408 ||  || — || December 31, 1997 || Oizumi || T. Kobayashi || MAS || align=right | 2.4 km || 
|-id=409 bgcolor=#fefefe
| 35409 ||  || — || December 31, 1997 || Oizumi || T. Kobayashi || — || align=right | 4.2 km || 
|-id=410 bgcolor=#fefefe
| 35410 ||  || — || December 28, 1997 || Kitt Peak || Spacewatch || — || align=right | 3.2 km || 
|-id=411 bgcolor=#fefefe
| 35411 ||  || — || December 29, 1997 || Xinglong || SCAP || — || align=right | 2.5 km || 
|-id=412 bgcolor=#fefefe
| 35412 ||  || — || December 31, 1997 || Kitt Peak || Spacewatch || MAS || align=right | 2.0 km || 
|-id=413 bgcolor=#fefefe
| 35413 || 1998 AS || — || January 5, 1998 || Oizumi || T. Kobayashi || MAS || align=right | 2.1 km || 
|-id=414 bgcolor=#fefefe
| 35414 ||  || — || January 3, 1998 || Xinglong || SCAP || V || align=right | 1.7 km || 
|-id=415 bgcolor=#fefefe
| 35415 ||  || — || January 3, 1998 || Xinglong || SCAP || — || align=right | 4.1 km || 
|-id=416 bgcolor=#fefefe
| 35416 ||  || — || January 2, 1998 || Kitt Peak || Spacewatch || NYS || align=right | 2.7 km || 
|-id=417 bgcolor=#fefefe
| 35417 ||  || — || January 6, 1998 || Kitt Peak || Spacewatch || — || align=right | 3.6 km || 
|-id=418 bgcolor=#E9E9E9
| 35418 ||  || — || January 8, 1998 || Caussols || ODAS || MAR || align=right | 3.8 km || 
|-id=419 bgcolor=#fefefe
| 35419 Beckysmethurst ||  ||  || January 8, 1998 || Caussols || ODAS || V || align=right | 2.2 km || 
|-id=420 bgcolor=#d6d6d6
| 35420 ||  || — || January 8, 1998 || Caussols || ODAS || — || align=right | 6.6 km || 
|-id=421 bgcolor=#E9E9E9
| 35421 ||  || — || January 4, 1998 || Xinglong || SCAP || — || align=right | 3.5 km || 
|-id=422 bgcolor=#fefefe
| 35422 ||  || — || January 5, 1998 || Xinglong || SCAP || — || align=right | 2.4 km || 
|-id=423 bgcolor=#fefefe
| 35423 ||  || — || January 6, 1998 || Oizumi || T. Kobayashi || NYS || align=right | 3.2 km || 
|-id=424 bgcolor=#fefefe
| 35424 || 1998 BK || — || January 18, 1998 || Oizumi || T. Kobayashi || ERI || align=right | 5.5 km || 
|-id=425 bgcolor=#fefefe
| 35425 || 1998 BY || — || January 19, 1998 || Oizumi || T. Kobayashi || — || align=right | 2.9 km || 
|-id=426 bgcolor=#fefefe
| 35426 ||  || — || January 19, 1998 || Oizumi || T. Kobayashi || FLO || align=right | 2.3 km || 
|-id=427 bgcolor=#fefefe
| 35427 Chelseawang ||  ||  || January 20, 1998 || Socorro || LINEAR || NYS || align=right | 3.3 km || 
|-id=428 bgcolor=#fefefe
| 35428 ||  || — || January 19, 1998 || Nachi-Katsuura || Y. Shimizu, T. Urata || — || align=right | 3.5 km || 
|-id=429 bgcolor=#E9E9E9
| 35429 Bochartdesaron ||  ||  || January 18, 1998 || Caussols || ODAS || — || align=right | 3.2 km || 
|-id=430 bgcolor=#fefefe
| 35430 ||  || — || January 24, 1998 || Oizumi || T. Kobayashi || — || align=right | 2.5 km || 
|-id=431 bgcolor=#E9E9E9
| 35431 ||  || — || January 24, 1998 || Oizumi || T. Kobayashi || — || align=right | 7.1 km || 
|-id=432 bgcolor=#FFC2E0
| 35432 ||  || — || January 24, 1998 || Haleakala || NEAT || AMO || align=right data-sort-value="0.50" | 500 m || 
|-id=433 bgcolor=#fefefe
| 35433 ||  || — || January 22, 1998 || Kitt Peak || Spacewatch || — || align=right | 2.3 km || 
|-id=434 bgcolor=#E9E9E9
| 35434 ||  || — || January 24, 1998 || Socorro || LINEAR || — || align=right | 2.8 km || 
|-id=435 bgcolor=#fefefe
| 35435 Erikayang ||  ||  || January 24, 1998 || Socorro || LINEAR || FLO || align=right | 3.1 km || 
|-id=436 bgcolor=#E9E9E9
| 35436 ||  || — || January 24, 1998 || Haleakala || NEAT || — || align=right | 9.5 km || 
|-id=437 bgcolor=#E9E9E9
| 35437 ||  || — || January 18, 1998 || Kitt Peak || Spacewatch || — || align=right | 2.0 km || 
|-id=438 bgcolor=#E9E9E9
| 35438 ||  || — || January 23, 1998 || Kitt Peak || Spacewatch || — || align=right | 3.5 km || 
|-id=439 bgcolor=#fefefe
| 35439 ||  || — || January 28, 1998 || Oizumi || T. Kobayashi || V || align=right | 3.2 km || 
|-id=440 bgcolor=#fefefe
| 35440 ||  || — || January 29, 1998 || Prescott || P. G. Comba || — || align=right | 2.4 km || 
|-id=441 bgcolor=#E9E9E9
| 35441 Kyoko ||  ||  || January 31, 1998 || Mishima || M. Akiyama || EUN || align=right | 3.7 km || 
|-id=442 bgcolor=#fefefe
| 35442 ||  || — || January 31, 1998 || Oizumi || T. Kobayashi || — || align=right | 4.6 km || 
|-id=443 bgcolor=#fefefe
| 35443 ||  || — || January 20, 1998 || Xinglong || SCAP || — || align=right | 3.6 km || 
|-id=444 bgcolor=#fefefe
| 35444 Giuliamarconcini ||  ||  || January 25, 1998 || Cima Ekar || U. Munari, M. Tombelli || — || align=right | 2.8 km || 
|-id=445 bgcolor=#fefefe
| 35445 || 1998 CY || — || February 5, 1998 || Kleť || M. Tichý, Z. Moravec || — || align=right | 2.2 km || 
|-id=446 bgcolor=#fefefe
| 35446 Stáňa ||  ||  || February 6, 1998 || Kleť || J. Tichá, M. Tichý || — || align=right | 2.7 km || 
|-id=447 bgcolor=#fefefe
| 35447 ||  || — || February 6, 1998 || La Silla || E. W. Elst || — || align=right | 4.0 km || 
|-id=448 bgcolor=#fefefe
| 35448 ||  || — || February 6, 1998 || La Silla || E. W. Elst || V || align=right | 2.7 km || 
|-id=449 bgcolor=#d6d6d6
| 35449 ||  || — || February 6, 1998 || La Silla || E. W. Elst || — || align=right | 7.2 km || 
|-id=450 bgcolor=#E9E9E9
| 35450 ||  || — || February 6, 1998 || La Silla || E. W. Elst || RAF || align=right | 4.3 km || 
|-id=451 bgcolor=#E9E9E9
| 35451 ||  || — || February 6, 1998 || La Silla || E. W. Elst || EUN || align=right | 3.9 km || 
|-id=452 bgcolor=#E9E9E9
| 35452 ||  || — || February 22, 1998 || Haleakala || NEAT || — || align=right | 4.0 km || 
|-id=453 bgcolor=#E9E9E9
| 35453 ||  || — || February 22, 1998 || Haleakala || NEAT || DOR || align=right | 5.4 km || 
|-id=454 bgcolor=#d6d6d6
| 35454 ||  || — || February 27, 1998 || Caussols || ODAS || — || align=right | 12 km || 
|-id=455 bgcolor=#E9E9E9
| 35455 ||  || — || February 22, 1998 || Haleakala || NEAT || — || align=right | 2.8 km || 
|-id=456 bgcolor=#E9E9E9
| 35456 ||  || — || February 22, 1998 || Haleakala || NEAT || WIT || align=right | 3.6 km || 
|-id=457 bgcolor=#fefefe
| 35457 ||  || — || February 22, 1998 || Haleakala || NEAT || — || align=right | 3.7 km || 
|-id=458 bgcolor=#E9E9E9
| 35458 ||  || — || February 23, 1998 || Haleakala || NEAT || MAR || align=right | 2.8 km || 
|-id=459 bgcolor=#fefefe
| 35459 ||  || — || February 27, 1998 || Ondřejov || L. Kotková || — || align=right | 5.2 km || 
|-id=460 bgcolor=#fefefe
| 35460 ||  || — || February 26, 1998 || Xinglong || SCAP || NYS || align=right | 2.4 km || 
|-id=461 bgcolor=#fefefe
| 35461 Mazzucato ||  ||  || February 26, 1998 || San Marcello || L. Tesi, A. Boattini || V || align=right | 1.5 km || 
|-id=462 bgcolor=#E9E9E9
| 35462 Maramkaire ||  ||  || February 27, 1998 || Caussols || ODAS || — || align=right | 4.1 km || 
|-id=463 bgcolor=#E9E9E9
| 35463 ||  || — || February 22, 1998 || Xinglong || SCAP || — || align=right | 5.6 km || 
|-id=464 bgcolor=#fefefe
| 35464 Elisaconsigli ||  ||  || February 27, 1998 || Cima Ekar || G. Forti, M. Tombelli || KLI || align=right | 6.6 km || 
|-id=465 bgcolor=#fefefe
| 35465 Emilianoricci ||  ||  || February 27, 1998 || Cima Ekar || U. Munari, M. Tombelli || V || align=right | 3.2 km || 
|-id=466 bgcolor=#E9E9E9
| 35466 ||  || — || February 27, 1998 || La Silla || E. W. Elst || — || align=right | 2.0 km || 
|-id=467 bgcolor=#E9E9E9
| 35467 || 1998 ED || — || March 1, 1998 || Oizumi || T. Kobayashi || EUN || align=right | 4.1 km || 
|-id=468 bgcolor=#E9E9E9
| 35468 ||  || — || March 2, 1998 || Caussols || ODAS || — || align=right | 3.3 km || 
|-id=469 bgcolor=#fefefe
| 35469 ||  || — || March 2, 1998 || Prescott || P. G. Comba || — || align=right | 3.1 km || 
|-id=470 bgcolor=#d6d6d6
| 35470 ||  || — || March 2, 1998 || Xinglong || SCAP || — || align=right | 3.9 km || 
|-id=471 bgcolor=#E9E9E9
| 35471 ||  || — || March 2, 1998 || Xinglong || SCAP || — || align=right | 3.1 km || 
|-id=472 bgcolor=#E9E9E9
| 35472 ||  || — || March 2, 1998 || Xinglong || SCAP || — || align=right | 2.8 km || 
|-id=473 bgcolor=#E9E9E9
| 35473 ||  || — || March 9, 1998 || Uccle || T. Pauwels || — || align=right | 4.0 km || 
|-id=474 bgcolor=#E9E9E9
| 35474 ||  || — || March 9, 1998 || Uccle || T. Pauwels || — || align=right | 3.4 km || 
|-id=475 bgcolor=#fefefe
| 35475 ||  || — || March 6, 1998 || Gekko || T. Kagawa || NYS || align=right | 2.3 km || 
|-id=476 bgcolor=#E9E9E9
| 35476 ||  || — || March 1, 1998 || La Silla || E. W. Elst || — || align=right | 2.9 km || 
|-id=477 bgcolor=#d6d6d6
| 35477 ||  || — || March 1, 1998 || La Silla || E. W. Elst || — || align=right | 6.0 km || 
|-id=478 bgcolor=#fefefe
| 35478 ||  || — || March 1, 1998 || La Silla || E. W. Elst || — || align=right | 3.7 km || 
|-id=479 bgcolor=#E9E9E9
| 35479 ||  || — || March 23, 1998 || Kitt Peak || Spacewatch || — || align=right | 5.6 km || 
|-id=480 bgcolor=#E9E9E9
| 35480 ||  || — || March 24, 1998 || Woomera || F. B. Zoltowski || EUN || align=right | 3.9 km || 
|-id=481 bgcolor=#E9E9E9
| 35481 ||  || — || March 20, 1998 || Kitt Peak || Spacewatch || — || align=right | 5.5 km || 
|-id=482 bgcolor=#E9E9E9
| 35482 ||  || — || March 22, 1998 || Oizumi || T. Kobayashi || — || align=right | 3.0 km || 
|-id=483 bgcolor=#E9E9E9
| 35483 ||  || — || March 20, 1998 || Xinglong || SCAP || — || align=right | 3.5 km || 
|-id=484 bgcolor=#E9E9E9
| 35484 ||  || — || March 25, 1998 || Haleakala || NEAT || — || align=right | 3.0 km || 
|-id=485 bgcolor=#d6d6d6
| 35485 ||  || — || March 24, 1998 || Woomera || F. B. Zoltowski || — || align=right | 6.1 km || 
|-id=486 bgcolor=#E9E9E9
| 35486 ||  || — || March 27, 1998 || Farra d'Isonzo || Farra d'Isonzo || — || align=right | 5.3 km || 
|-id=487 bgcolor=#E9E9E9
| 35487 ||  || — || March 20, 1998 || Socorro || LINEAR || — || align=right | 3.7 km || 
|-id=488 bgcolor=#E9E9E9
| 35488 ||  || — || March 20, 1998 || Socorro || LINEAR || — || align=right | 3.6 km || 
|-id=489 bgcolor=#E9E9E9
| 35489 ||  || — || March 20, 1998 || Socorro || LINEAR || — || align=right | 5.4 km || 
|-id=490 bgcolor=#E9E9E9
| 35490 ||  || — || March 20, 1998 || Socorro || LINEAR || MAR || align=right | 3.0 km || 
|-id=491 bgcolor=#E9E9E9
| 35491 ||  || — || March 20, 1998 || Socorro || LINEAR || — || align=right | 3.0 km || 
|-id=492 bgcolor=#E9E9E9
| 35492 ||  || — || March 20, 1998 || Socorro || LINEAR || — || align=right | 2.5 km || 
|-id=493 bgcolor=#E9E9E9
| 35493 ||  || — || March 20, 1998 || Socorro || LINEAR || — || align=right | 4.1 km || 
|-id=494 bgcolor=#E9E9E9
| 35494 ||  || — || March 20, 1998 || Socorro || LINEAR || — || align=right | 2.9 km || 
|-id=495 bgcolor=#E9E9E9
| 35495 ||  || — || March 20, 1998 || Socorro || LINEAR || — || align=right | 4.2 km || 
|-id=496 bgcolor=#E9E9E9
| 35496 ||  || — || March 20, 1998 || Socorro || LINEAR || HNS || align=right | 5.5 km || 
|-id=497 bgcolor=#E9E9E9
| 35497 ||  || — || March 20, 1998 || Socorro || LINEAR || — || align=right | 3.3 km || 
|-id=498 bgcolor=#d6d6d6
| 35498 ||  || — || March 20, 1998 || Socorro || LINEAR || — || align=right | 8.5 km || 
|-id=499 bgcolor=#E9E9E9
| 35499 ||  || — || March 20, 1998 || Socorro || LINEAR || — || align=right | 11 km || 
|-id=500 bgcolor=#E9E9E9
| 35500 ||  || — || March 20, 1998 || Socorro || LINEAR || — || align=right | 4.2 km || 
|}

35501–35600 

|-bgcolor=#E9E9E9
| 35501 ||  || — || March 20, 1998 || Socorro || LINEAR || — || align=right | 2.6 km || 
|-id=502 bgcolor=#E9E9E9
| 35502 ||  || — || March 20, 1998 || Socorro || LINEAR || — || align=right | 4.1 km || 
|-id=503 bgcolor=#d6d6d6
| 35503 ||  || — || March 20, 1998 || Socorro || LINEAR || — || align=right | 10 km || 
|-id=504 bgcolor=#E9E9E9
| 35504 ||  || — || March 20, 1998 || Socorro || LINEAR || EUN || align=right | 5.5 km || 
|-id=505 bgcolor=#E9E9E9
| 35505 ||  || — || March 20, 1998 || Socorro || LINEAR || — || align=right | 3.3 km || 
|-id=506 bgcolor=#E9E9E9
| 35506 ||  || — || March 20, 1998 || Socorro || LINEAR || — || align=right | 5.2 km || 
|-id=507 bgcolor=#E9E9E9
| 35507 ||  || — || March 20, 1998 || Socorro || LINEAR || — || align=right | 4.9 km || 
|-id=508 bgcolor=#E9E9E9
| 35508 ||  || — || March 20, 1998 || Socorro || LINEAR || — || align=right | 5.8 km || 
|-id=509 bgcolor=#d6d6d6
| 35509 ||  || — || March 20, 1998 || Socorro || LINEAR || — || align=right | 8.6 km || 
|-id=510 bgcolor=#E9E9E9
| 35510 ||  || — || March 20, 1998 || Socorro || LINEAR || — || align=right | 6.8 km || 
|-id=511 bgcolor=#E9E9E9
| 35511 ||  || — || March 20, 1998 || Socorro || LINEAR || — || align=right | 4.0 km || 
|-id=512 bgcolor=#E9E9E9
| 35512 ||  || — || March 20, 1998 || Socorro || LINEAR || MRX || align=right | 2.5 km || 
|-id=513 bgcolor=#d6d6d6
| 35513 ||  || — || March 20, 1998 || Socorro || LINEAR || KOR || align=right | 3.3 km || 
|-id=514 bgcolor=#d6d6d6
| 35514 ||  || — || March 20, 1998 || Socorro || LINEAR || TEL || align=right | 4.4 km || 
|-id=515 bgcolor=#E9E9E9
| 35515 ||  || — || March 20, 1998 || Socorro || LINEAR || — || align=right | 2.5 km || 
|-id=516 bgcolor=#E9E9E9
| 35516 ||  || — || March 20, 1998 || Socorro || LINEAR || GEF || align=right | 3.7 km || 
|-id=517 bgcolor=#d6d6d6
| 35517 ||  || — || March 20, 1998 || Socorro || LINEAR || EOS || align=right | 7.7 km || 
|-id=518 bgcolor=#fefefe
| 35518 ||  || — || March 20, 1998 || Socorro || LINEAR || — || align=right | 4.6 km || 
|-id=519 bgcolor=#E9E9E9
| 35519 ||  || — || March 20, 1998 || Socorro || LINEAR || — || align=right | 7.6 km || 
|-id=520 bgcolor=#E9E9E9
| 35520 ||  || — || March 20, 1998 || Socorro || LINEAR || AGN || align=right | 3.6 km || 
|-id=521 bgcolor=#E9E9E9
| 35521 ||  || — || March 20, 1998 || Socorro || LINEAR || — || align=right | 5.2 km || 
|-id=522 bgcolor=#E9E9E9
| 35522 ||  || — || March 20, 1998 || Socorro || LINEAR || — || align=right | 5.2 km || 
|-id=523 bgcolor=#d6d6d6
| 35523 ||  || — || March 20, 1998 || Socorro || LINEAR || — || align=right | 7.3 km || 
|-id=524 bgcolor=#E9E9E9
| 35524 ||  || — || March 20, 1998 || Socorro || LINEAR || GEF || align=right | 3.7 km || 
|-id=525 bgcolor=#d6d6d6
| 35525 ||  || — || March 20, 1998 || Socorro || LINEAR || KOR || align=right | 3.5 km || 
|-id=526 bgcolor=#d6d6d6
| 35526 ||  || — || March 20, 1998 || Socorro || LINEAR || — || align=right | 7.3 km || 
|-id=527 bgcolor=#d6d6d6
| 35527 ||  || — || March 20, 1998 || Socorro || LINEAR || — || align=right | 9.0 km || 
|-id=528 bgcolor=#E9E9E9
| 35528 ||  || — || March 20, 1998 || Socorro || LINEAR || — || align=right | 3.1 km || 
|-id=529 bgcolor=#E9E9E9
| 35529 ||  || — || March 20, 1998 || Socorro || LINEAR || DOR || align=right | 6.4 km || 
|-id=530 bgcolor=#E9E9E9
| 35530 ||  || — || March 20, 1998 || Socorro || LINEAR || MAR || align=right | 3.6 km || 
|-id=531 bgcolor=#E9E9E9
| 35531 ||  || — || March 20, 1998 || Socorro || LINEAR || — || align=right | 7.8 km || 
|-id=532 bgcolor=#E9E9E9
| 35532 ||  || — || March 20, 1998 || Socorro || LINEAR || slow || align=right | 4.0 km || 
|-id=533 bgcolor=#d6d6d6
| 35533 ||  || — || March 20, 1998 || Socorro || LINEAR || — || align=right | 5.9 km || 
|-id=534 bgcolor=#d6d6d6
| 35534 Clementfeller ||  ||  || March 20, 1998 || Anderson Mesa || LONEOS || EUP || align=right | 17 km || 
|-id=535 bgcolor=#E9E9E9
| 35535 ||  || — || March 24, 1998 || Socorro || LINEAR || — || align=right | 4.4 km || 
|-id=536 bgcolor=#E9E9E9
| 35536 ||  || — || March 24, 1998 || Socorro || LINEAR || — || align=right | 2.5 km || 
|-id=537 bgcolor=#E9E9E9
| 35537 ||  || — || March 24, 1998 || Socorro || LINEAR || — || align=right | 6.9 km || 
|-id=538 bgcolor=#E9E9E9
| 35538 ||  || — || March 24, 1998 || Socorro || LINEAR || — || align=right | 6.4 km || 
|-id=539 bgcolor=#E9E9E9
| 35539 ||  || — || March 24, 1998 || Socorro || LINEAR || — || align=right | 5.9 km || 
|-id=540 bgcolor=#d6d6d6
| 35540 ||  || — || March 24, 1998 || Socorro || LINEAR || — || align=right | 4.8 km || 
|-id=541 bgcolor=#E9E9E9
| 35541 ||  || — || March 31, 1998 || Socorro || LINEAR || — || align=right | 2.9 km || 
|-id=542 bgcolor=#E9E9E9
| 35542 ||  || — || March 31, 1998 || Socorro || LINEAR || — || align=right | 7.1 km || 
|-id=543 bgcolor=#E9E9E9
| 35543 ||  || — || March 31, 1998 || Socorro || LINEAR || — || align=right | 4.9 km || 
|-id=544 bgcolor=#E9E9E9
| 35544 ||  || — || March 31, 1998 || Socorro || LINEAR || MAR || align=right | 3.6 km || 
|-id=545 bgcolor=#E9E9E9
| 35545 ||  || — || March 31, 1998 || Socorro || LINEAR || — || align=right | 2.9 km || 
|-id=546 bgcolor=#E9E9E9
| 35546 ||  || — || March 31, 1998 || Socorro || LINEAR || — || align=right | 3.2 km || 
|-id=547 bgcolor=#E9E9E9
| 35547 ||  || — || March 31, 1998 || Socorro || LINEAR || — || align=right | 3.6 km || 
|-id=548 bgcolor=#d6d6d6
| 35548 ||  || — || March 31, 1998 || Socorro || LINEAR || BRA || align=right | 5.2 km || 
|-id=549 bgcolor=#E9E9E9
| 35549 ||  || — || March 31, 1998 || Socorro || LINEAR || — || align=right | 4.6 km || 
|-id=550 bgcolor=#d6d6d6
| 35550 ||  || — || March 31, 1998 || Socorro || LINEAR || EOS || align=right | 4.6 km || 
|-id=551 bgcolor=#E9E9E9
| 35551 ||  || — || March 31, 1998 || Socorro || LINEAR || — || align=right | 5.3 km || 
|-id=552 bgcolor=#E9E9E9
| 35552 ||  || — || March 31, 1998 || Socorro || LINEAR || ADE || align=right | 13 km || 
|-id=553 bgcolor=#E9E9E9
| 35553 ||  || — || March 31, 1998 || Socorro || LINEAR || — || align=right | 5.5 km || 
|-id=554 bgcolor=#E9E9E9
| 35554 ||  || — || March 31, 1998 || Socorro || LINEAR || — || align=right | 6.7 km || 
|-id=555 bgcolor=#d6d6d6
| 35555 ||  || — || March 20, 1998 || Socorro || LINEAR || — || align=right | 5.2 km || 
|-id=556 bgcolor=#E9E9E9
| 35556 ||  || — || March 20, 1998 || Socorro || LINEAR || — || align=right | 9.2 km || 
|-id=557 bgcolor=#d6d6d6
| 35557 ||  || — || March 20, 1998 || Socorro || LINEAR || HYG || align=right | 9.7 km || 
|-id=558 bgcolor=#E9E9E9
| 35558 ||  || — || March 20, 1998 || Socorro || LINEAR || — || align=right | 6.4 km || 
|-id=559 bgcolor=#E9E9E9
| 35559 ||  || — || March 24, 1998 || Socorro || LINEAR || — || align=right | 3.5 km || 
|-id=560 bgcolor=#E9E9E9
| 35560 ||  || — || March 22, 1998 || Socorro || LINEAR || — || align=right | 3.3 km || 
|-id=561 bgcolor=#E9E9E9
| 35561 ||  || — || March 20, 1998 || Socorro || LINEAR || EUN || align=right | 3.4 km || 
|-id=562 bgcolor=#E9E9E9
| 35562 ||  || — || April 5, 1998 || Woomera || F. B. Zoltowski || — || align=right | 5.0 km || 
|-id=563 bgcolor=#E9E9E9
| 35563 ||  || — || April 2, 1998 || Socorro || LINEAR || — || align=right | 3.2 km || 
|-id=564 bgcolor=#E9E9E9
| 35564 ||  || — || April 2, 1998 || Socorro || LINEAR || — || align=right | 3.3 km || 
|-id=565 bgcolor=#E9E9E9
| 35565 ||  || — || April 2, 1998 || Socorro || LINEAR || — || align=right | 3.3 km || 
|-id=566 bgcolor=#E9E9E9
| 35566 ||  || — || April 2, 1998 || Socorro || LINEAR || EUN || align=right | 6.0 km || 
|-id=567 bgcolor=#E9E9E9
| 35567 ||  || — || April 2, 1998 || Socorro || LINEAR || — || align=right | 2.4 km || 
|-id=568 bgcolor=#E9E9E9
| 35568 ||  || — || April 2, 1998 || Socorro || LINEAR || EUN || align=right | 5.0 km || 
|-id=569 bgcolor=#E9E9E9
| 35569 ||  || — || April 2, 1998 || Socorro || LINEAR || MAR || align=right | 4.7 km || 
|-id=570 bgcolor=#E9E9E9
| 35570 ||  || — || April 2, 1998 || Socorro || LINEAR || — || align=right | 6.7 km || 
|-id=571 bgcolor=#E9E9E9
| 35571 ||  || — || April 21, 1998 || Les Tardieux Obs. || M. Boeuf || — || align=right | 6.8 km || 
|-id=572 bgcolor=#E9E9E9
| 35572 ||  || — || April 19, 1998 || Nachi-Katsuura || Y. Shimizu, T. Urata || — || align=right | 12 km || 
|-id=573 bgcolor=#E9E9E9
| 35573 ||  || — || April 18, 1998 || Kitt Peak || Spacewatch || — || align=right | 8.8 km || 
|-id=574 bgcolor=#E9E9E9
| 35574 ||  || — || April 19, 1998 || Kitt Peak || Spacewatch || — || align=right | 5.0 km || 
|-id=575 bgcolor=#E9E9E9
| 35575 ||  || — || April 18, 1998 || Socorro || LINEAR || — || align=right | 5.2 km || 
|-id=576 bgcolor=#E9E9E9
| 35576 ||  || — || April 20, 1998 || Socorro || LINEAR || — || align=right | 5.0 km || 
|-id=577 bgcolor=#E9E9E9
| 35577 ||  || — || April 21, 1998 || Kitt Peak || Spacewatch || — || align=right | 5.9 km || 
|-id=578 bgcolor=#d6d6d6
| 35578 ||  || — || April 20, 1998 || Socorro || LINEAR || KOR || align=right | 3.9 km || 
|-id=579 bgcolor=#E9E9E9
| 35579 ||  || — || April 20, 1998 || Socorro || LINEAR || — || align=right | 3.9 km || 
|-id=580 bgcolor=#E9E9E9
| 35580 ||  || — || April 20, 1998 || Socorro || LINEAR || NEM || align=right | 8.3 km || 
|-id=581 bgcolor=#E9E9E9
| 35581 ||  || — || April 20, 1998 || Socorro || LINEAR || — || align=right | 4.7 km || 
|-id=582 bgcolor=#E9E9E9
| 35582 ||  || — || April 20, 1998 || Socorro || LINEAR || — || align=right | 4.6 km || 
|-id=583 bgcolor=#E9E9E9
| 35583 ||  || — || April 20, 1998 || Socorro || LINEAR || — || align=right | 4.4 km || 
|-id=584 bgcolor=#E9E9E9
| 35584 ||  || — || April 20, 1998 || Socorro || LINEAR || — || align=right | 4.9 km || 
|-id=585 bgcolor=#E9E9E9
| 35585 ||  || — || April 30, 1998 || Anderson Mesa || LONEOS || — || align=right | 6.9 km || 
|-id=586 bgcolor=#E9E9E9
| 35586 ||  || — || April 21, 1998 || Socorro || LINEAR || — || align=right | 6.7 km || 
|-id=587 bgcolor=#E9E9E9
| 35587 ||  || — || April 21, 1998 || Socorro || LINEAR || AGN || align=right | 5.7 km || 
|-id=588 bgcolor=#E9E9E9
| 35588 ||  || — || April 21, 1998 || Socorro || LINEAR || — || align=right | 2.9 km || 
|-id=589 bgcolor=#d6d6d6
| 35589 ||  || — || April 21, 1998 || Socorro || LINEAR || — || align=right | 7.8 km || 
|-id=590 bgcolor=#d6d6d6
| 35590 ||  || — || April 21, 1998 || Socorro || LINEAR || KOR || align=right | 4.3 km || 
|-id=591 bgcolor=#E9E9E9
| 35591 ||  || — || April 21, 1998 || Socorro || LINEAR || — || align=right | 6.4 km || 
|-id=592 bgcolor=#E9E9E9
| 35592 ||  || — || April 21, 1998 || Socorro || LINEAR || EUN || align=right | 6.0 km || 
|-id=593 bgcolor=#d6d6d6
| 35593 ||  || — || April 21, 1998 || Socorro || LINEAR || CHA || align=right | 7.6 km || 
|-id=594 bgcolor=#d6d6d6
| 35594 ||  || — || April 23, 1998 || Socorro || LINEAR || — || align=right | 10 km || 
|-id=595 bgcolor=#E9E9E9
| 35595 ||  || — || April 23, 1998 || Socorro || LINEAR || — || align=right | 6.2 km || 
|-id=596 bgcolor=#E9E9E9
| 35596 ||  || — || April 23, 1998 || Socorro || LINEAR || fast? || align=right | 4.2 km || 
|-id=597 bgcolor=#E9E9E9
| 35597 ||  || — || April 23, 1998 || Socorro || LINEAR || — || align=right | 3.3 km || 
|-id=598 bgcolor=#d6d6d6
| 35598 ||  || — || April 23, 1998 || Socorro || LINEAR || — || align=right | 11 km || 
|-id=599 bgcolor=#d6d6d6
| 35599 ||  || — || April 23, 1998 || Socorro || LINEAR || — || align=right | 5.3 km || 
|-id=600 bgcolor=#E9E9E9
| 35600 ||  || — || April 23, 1998 || Socorro || LINEAR || — || align=right | 3.3 km || 
|}

35601–35700 

|-bgcolor=#E9E9E9
| 35601 ||  || — || April 23, 1998 || Socorro || LINEAR || — || align=right | 4.3 km || 
|-id=602 bgcolor=#E9E9E9
| 35602 ||  || — || April 23, 1998 || Socorro || LINEAR || — || align=right | 7.0 km || 
|-id=603 bgcolor=#E9E9E9
| 35603 ||  || — || April 23, 1998 || Socorro || LINEAR || PAD || align=right | 5.8 km || 
|-id=604 bgcolor=#E9E9E9
| 35604 ||  || — || April 23, 1998 || Socorro || LINEAR || — || align=right | 6.8 km || 
|-id=605 bgcolor=#d6d6d6
| 35605 ||  || — || April 23, 1998 || Socorro || LINEAR || EOS || align=right | 12 km || 
|-id=606 bgcolor=#E9E9E9
| 35606 ||  || — || April 23, 1998 || Socorro || LINEAR || — || align=right | 2.6 km || 
|-id=607 bgcolor=#E9E9E9
| 35607 ||  || — || April 18, 1998 || Socorro || LINEAR || — || align=right | 3.1 km || 
|-id=608 bgcolor=#E9E9E9
| 35608 ||  || — || April 18, 1998 || Socorro || LINEAR || MRX || align=right | 2.7 km || 
|-id=609 bgcolor=#d6d6d6
| 35609 ||  || — || April 19, 1998 || Socorro || LINEAR || — || align=right | 4.3 km || 
|-id=610 bgcolor=#E9E9E9
| 35610 ||  || — || April 19, 1998 || Socorro || LINEAR || — || align=right | 2.3 km || 
|-id=611 bgcolor=#d6d6d6
| 35611 ||  || — || April 20, 1998 || Socorro || LINEAR || — || align=right | 8.3 km || 
|-id=612 bgcolor=#d6d6d6
| 35612 ||  || — || April 20, 1998 || Socorro || LINEAR || KOR || align=right | 4.4 km || 
|-id=613 bgcolor=#d6d6d6
| 35613 ||  || — || April 23, 1998 || Socorro || LINEAR || EOS || align=right | 6.0 km || 
|-id=614 bgcolor=#d6d6d6
| 35614 ||  || — || April 25, 1998 || La Silla || E. W. Elst || THM || align=right | 7.0 km || 
|-id=615 bgcolor=#E9E9E9
| 35615 ||  || — || April 25, 1998 || La Silla || E. W. Elst || — || align=right | 2.9 km || 
|-id=616 bgcolor=#d6d6d6
| 35616 ||  || — || April 25, 1998 || La Silla || E. W. Elst || KOR || align=right | 4.6 km || 
|-id=617 bgcolor=#E9E9E9
| 35617 ||  || — || April 25, 1998 || La Silla || E. W. Elst || — || align=right | 4.3 km || 
|-id=618 bgcolor=#d6d6d6
| 35618 Tartu ||  ||  || April 25, 1998 || La Silla || E. W. Elst || — || align=right | 9.4 km || 
|-id=619 bgcolor=#E9E9E9
| 35619 ||  || — || April 25, 1998 || La Silla || E. W. Elst || GEF || align=right | 6.1 km || 
|-id=620 bgcolor=#E9E9E9
| 35620 || 1998 JZ || — || May 1, 1998 || Haleakala || NEAT || ADE || align=right | 7.4 km || 
|-id=621 bgcolor=#d6d6d6
| 35621 ||  || — || May 15, 1998 || Modra || A. Galád, A. Pravda || — || align=right | 4.8 km || 
|-id=622 bgcolor=#E9E9E9
| 35622 ||  || — || May 5, 1998 || Woomera || F. B. Zoltowski || — || align=right | 7.1 km || 
|-id=623 bgcolor=#E9E9E9
| 35623 ||  || — || May 23, 1998 || Anderson Mesa || LONEOS || KRM || align=right | 4.9 km || 
|-id=624 bgcolor=#E9E9E9
| 35624 ||  || — || May 23, 1998 || Anderson Mesa || LONEOS || — || align=right | 8.9 km || 
|-id=625 bgcolor=#d6d6d6
| 35625 ||  || — || May 23, 1998 || Anderson Mesa || LONEOS || EOS || align=right | 6.5 km || 
|-id=626 bgcolor=#E9E9E9
| 35626 ||  || — || May 27, 1998 || Anderson Mesa || LONEOS || — || align=right | 3.7 km || 
|-id=627 bgcolor=#d6d6d6
| 35627 ||  || — || May 24, 1998 || Xinglong || SCAP || LIX || align=right | 15 km || 
|-id=628 bgcolor=#d6d6d6
| 35628 ||  || — || May 22, 1998 || Socorro || LINEAR || — || align=right | 5.8 km || 
|-id=629 bgcolor=#E9E9E9
| 35629 ||  || — || May 22, 1998 || Socorro || LINEAR || — || align=right | 6.2 km || 
|-id=630 bgcolor=#d6d6d6
| 35630 ||  || — || May 22, 1998 || Socorro || LINEAR || HIL3:2 || align=right | 17 km || 
|-id=631 bgcolor=#d6d6d6
| 35631 ||  || — || May 22, 1998 || Socorro || LINEAR || — || align=right | 5.6 km || 
|-id=632 bgcolor=#d6d6d6
| 35632 ||  || — || May 22, 1998 || Socorro || LINEAR || — || align=right | 4.9 km || 
|-id=633 bgcolor=#E9E9E9
| 35633 ||  || — || May 22, 1998 || Socorro || LINEAR || — || align=right | 5.2 km || 
|-id=634 bgcolor=#d6d6d6
| 35634 ||  || — || May 22, 1998 || Socorro || LINEAR || EOS || align=right | 6.8 km || 
|-id=635 bgcolor=#d6d6d6
| 35635 ||  || — || May 22, 1998 || Socorro || LINEAR || — || align=right | 6.1 km || 
|-id=636 bgcolor=#E9E9E9
| 35636 ||  || — || May 22, 1998 || Socorro || LINEAR || — || align=right | 3.1 km || 
|-id=637 bgcolor=#E9E9E9
| 35637 ||  || — || May 22, 1998 || Socorro || LINEAR || — || align=right | 3.7 km || 
|-id=638 bgcolor=#E9E9E9
| 35638 ||  || — || May 22, 1998 || Socorro || LINEAR || — || align=right | 4.0 km || 
|-id=639 bgcolor=#d6d6d6
| 35639 ||  || — || May 23, 1998 || Socorro || LINEAR || EOS || align=right | 6.4 km || 
|-id=640 bgcolor=#d6d6d6
| 35640 ||  || — || May 23, 1998 || Socorro || LINEAR || EOS || align=right | 5.9 km || 
|-id=641 bgcolor=#E9E9E9
| 35641 ||  || — || May 23, 1998 || Socorro || LINEAR || — || align=right | 4.0 km || 
|-id=642 bgcolor=#E9E9E9
| 35642 ||  || — || May 23, 1998 || Socorro || LINEAR || — || align=right | 5.3 km || 
|-id=643 bgcolor=#E9E9E9
| 35643 ||  || — || May 23, 1998 || Socorro || LINEAR || GEF || align=right | 5.1 km || 
|-id=644 bgcolor=#E9E9E9
| 35644 ||  || — || May 23, 1998 || Socorro || LINEAR || — || align=right | 5.8 km || 
|-id=645 bgcolor=#E9E9E9
| 35645 ||  || — || May 23, 1998 || Socorro || LINEAR || — || align=right | 5.1 km || 
|-id=646 bgcolor=#d6d6d6
| 35646 Estela ||  ||  || May 18, 1998 || Anderson Mesa || LONEOS || HYG || align=right | 7.2 km || 
|-id=647 bgcolor=#E9E9E9
| 35647 ||  || — || May 23, 1998 || Socorro || LINEAR || MAR || align=right | 3.4 km || 
|-id=648 bgcolor=#E9E9E9
| 35648 ||  || — || May 29, 1998 || Kitt Peak || Spacewatch || CLO || align=right | 7.6 km || 
|-id=649 bgcolor=#d6d6d6
| 35649 ||  || — || June 23, 1998 || Catalina || CSS || — || align=right | 12 km || 
|-id=650 bgcolor=#d6d6d6
| 35650 ||  || — || June 19, 1998 || Socorro || LINEAR || EOS || align=right | 6.4 km || 
|-id=651 bgcolor=#d6d6d6
| 35651 ||  || — || June 24, 1998 || Socorro || LINEAR || HYG || align=right | 11 km || 
|-id=652 bgcolor=#E9E9E9
| 35652 ||  || — || June 24, 1998 || Socorro || LINEAR || GEF || align=right | 5.2 km || 
|-id=653 bgcolor=#d6d6d6
| 35653 ||  || — || June 24, 1998 || Socorro || LINEAR || EOS || align=right | 9.1 km || 
|-id=654 bgcolor=#d6d6d6
| 35654 ||  || — || June 24, 1998 || Socorro || LINEAR || — || align=right | 6.5 km || 
|-id=655 bgcolor=#d6d6d6
| 35655 Étienneklein ||  ||  || July 24, 1998 || Caussols || ODAS || HYG || align=right | 7.9 km || 
|-id=656 bgcolor=#d6d6d6
| 35656 ||  || — || July 26, 1998 || La Silla || E. W. Elst || — || align=right | 19 km || 
|-id=657 bgcolor=#d6d6d6
| 35657 ||  || — || August 22, 1998 || Xinglong || SCAP || — || align=right | 6.7 km || 
|-id=658 bgcolor=#E9E9E9
| 35658 ||  || — || August 17, 1998 || Socorro || LINEAR || BRG || align=right | 3.8 km || 
|-id=659 bgcolor=#d6d6d6
| 35659 ||  || — || August 17, 1998 || Socorro || LINEAR || — || align=right | 10 km || 
|-id=660 bgcolor=#d6d6d6
| 35660 ||  || — || August 17, 1998 || Socorro || LINEAR || MEL || align=right | 10 km || 
|-id=661 bgcolor=#fefefe
| 35661 ||  || — || August 17, 1998 || Socorro || LINEAR || NYS || align=right | 2.6 km || 
|-id=662 bgcolor=#fefefe
| 35662 ||  || — || August 17, 1998 || Socorro || LINEAR || — || align=right | 1.7 km || 
|-id=663 bgcolor=#d6d6d6
| 35663 ||  || — || August 17, 1998 || Socorro || LINEAR || — || align=right | 5.4 km || 
|-id=664 bgcolor=#d6d6d6
| 35664 ||  || — || August 24, 1998 || Socorro || LINEAR || ALA || align=right | 12 km || 
|-id=665 bgcolor=#fefefe
| 35665 ||  || — || September 14, 1998 || Socorro || LINEAR || NYS || align=right | 2.0 km || 
|-id=666 bgcolor=#E9E9E9
| 35666 ||  || — || September 14, 1998 || Socorro || LINEAR || DOR || align=right | 7.8 km || 
|-id=667 bgcolor=#E9E9E9
| 35667 ||  || — || September 14, 1998 || Socorro || LINEAR || — || align=right | 4.2 km || 
|-id=668 bgcolor=#fefefe
| 35668 ||  || — || September 14, 1998 || Socorro || LINEAR || FLO || align=right | 2.9 km || 
|-id=669 bgcolor=#fefefe
| 35669 ||  || — || September 22, 1998 || Višnjan Observatory || Višnjan Obs. || H || align=right | 1.0 km || 
|-id=670 bgcolor=#FFC2E0
| 35670 ||  || — || September 24, 1998 || Socorro || LINEAR || APOcritical || align=right data-sort-value="0.49" | 490 m || 
|-id=671 bgcolor=#C2E0FF
| 35671 ||  || — || September 23, 1998 || Steward Observatory || A. Gleason || other TNO || align=right | 324 km || 
|-id=672 bgcolor=#C2FFFF
| 35672 ||  || — || October 23, 1998 || Kitt Peak || Spacewatch || L4 || align=right | 18 km || 
|-id=673 bgcolor=#C2FFFF
| 35673 ||  || — || November 10, 1998 || Socorro || LINEAR || L4 || align=right | 35 km || 
|-id=674 bgcolor=#fefefe
| 35674 ||  || — || November 14, 1998 || Socorro || LINEAR || H || align=right | 2.0 km || 
|-id=675 bgcolor=#fefefe
| 35675 ||  || — || December 15, 1998 || Bédoin || P. Antonini || V || align=right | 2.1 km || 
|-id=676 bgcolor=#E9E9E9
| 35676 ||  || — || December 14, 1998 || Socorro || LINEAR || EUN || align=right | 5.3 km || 
|-id=677 bgcolor=#fefefe
| 35677 ||  || — || December 15, 1998 || Socorro || LINEAR || — || align=right | 2.9 km || 
|-id=678 bgcolor=#fefefe
| 35678 ||  || — || December 11, 1998 || Mérida || O. A. Naranjo || — || align=right | 6.3 km || 
|-id=679 bgcolor=#fefefe
| 35679 ||  || — || December 17, 1998 || Oizumi || T. Kobayashi || FLO || align=right | 3.2 km || 
|-id=680 bgcolor=#fefefe
| 35680 ||  || — || January 15, 1999 || Višnjan Observatory || K. Korlević || — || align=right | 1.9 km || 
|-id=681 bgcolor=#fefefe
| 35681 ||  || — || January 16, 1999 || Nachi-Katsuura || Y. Shimizu, T. Urata || H || align=right | 2.0 km || 
|-id=682 bgcolor=#fefefe
| 35682 ||  || — || January 18, 1999 || Oizumi || T. Kobayashi || — || align=right | 2.7 km || 
|-id=683 bgcolor=#fefefe
| 35683 ||  || — || January 21, 1999 || Kleť || Kleť Obs. || — || align=right | 1.9 km || 
|-id=684 bgcolor=#fefefe
| 35684 ||  || — || January 16, 1999 || Kushiro || S. Ueda, H. Kaneda || — || align=right | 6.1 km || 
|-id=685 bgcolor=#fefefe
| 35685 ||  || — || January 21, 1999 || Caussols || ODAS || — || align=right | 1.7 km || 
|-id=686 bgcolor=#fefefe
| 35686 ||  || — || January 16, 1999 || Socorro || LINEAR || — || align=right | 2.3 km || 
|-id=687 bgcolor=#fefefe
| 35687 ||  || — || February 6, 1999 || Višnjan Observatory || K. Korlević || — || align=right | 1.8 km || 
|-id=688 bgcolor=#E9E9E9
| 35688 ||  || — || February 15, 1999 || High Point || D. K. Chesney || — || align=right | 6.5 km || 
|-id=689 bgcolor=#fefefe
| 35689 ||  || — || February 12, 1999 || Socorro || LINEAR || — || align=right | 3.8 km || 
|-id=690 bgcolor=#E9E9E9
| 35690 ||  || — || February 10, 1999 || Socorro || LINEAR || — || align=right | 3.8 km || 
|-id=691 bgcolor=#d6d6d6
| 35691 ||  || — || February 10, 1999 || Socorro || LINEAR || — || align=right | 5.7 km || 
|-id=692 bgcolor=#fefefe
| 35692 ||  || — || February 10, 1999 || Socorro || LINEAR || NYS || align=right | 2.2 km || 
|-id=693 bgcolor=#fefefe
| 35693 ||  || — || February 10, 1999 || Socorro || LINEAR || — || align=right | 1.8 km || 
|-id=694 bgcolor=#fefefe
| 35694 ||  || — || February 10, 1999 || Socorro || LINEAR || — || align=right | 2.8 km || 
|-id=695 bgcolor=#fefefe
| 35695 ||  || — || February 10, 1999 || Socorro || LINEAR || FLO || align=right | 3.3 km || 
|-id=696 bgcolor=#fefefe
| 35696 ||  || — || February 10, 1999 || Socorro || LINEAR || MAS || align=right | 2.5 km || 
|-id=697 bgcolor=#fefefe
| 35697 ||  || — || February 12, 1999 || Socorro || LINEAR || FLOslow || align=right | 3.7 km || 
|-id=698 bgcolor=#fefefe
| 35698 ||  || — || February 12, 1999 || Socorro || LINEAR || — || align=right | 2.3 km || 
|-id=699 bgcolor=#fefefe
| 35699 ||  || — || February 13, 1999 || Socorro || LINEAR || — || align=right | 1.9 km || 
|-id=700 bgcolor=#fefefe
| 35700 ||  || — || February 19, 1999 || Oizumi || T. Kobayashi || — || align=right | 2.7 km || 
|}

35701–35800 

|-bgcolor=#fefefe
| 35701 ||  || — || March 16, 1999 || Višnjan Observatory || K. Korlević || — || align=right | 1.9 km || 
|-id=702 bgcolor=#fefefe
| 35702 ||  || — || March 22, 1999 || Anderson Mesa || LONEOS || FLO || align=right | 2.3 km || 
|-id=703 bgcolor=#fefefe
| 35703 Lafiascaia ||  ||  || March 20, 1999 || Montelupo || M. Tombelli, E. Masotti || FLO || align=right | 3.6 km || 
|-id=704 bgcolor=#E9E9E9
| 35704 ||  || — || March 19, 1999 || Kitt Peak || Spacewatch || — || align=right | 2.5 km || 
|-id=705 bgcolor=#fefefe
| 35705 ||  || — || March 23, 1999 || Kitt Peak || Spacewatch || V || align=right | 1.8 km || 
|-id=706 bgcolor=#fefefe
| 35706 ||  || — || March 19, 1999 || Socorro || LINEAR || — || align=right | 3.0 km || 
|-id=707 bgcolor=#fefefe
| 35707 ||  || — || March 19, 1999 || Socorro || LINEAR || — || align=right | 2.6 km || 
|-id=708 bgcolor=#fefefe
| 35708 ||  || — || March 19, 1999 || Socorro || LINEAR || — || align=right | 3.4 km || 
|-id=709 bgcolor=#FA8072
| 35709 ||  || — || March 19, 1999 || Socorro || LINEAR || — || align=right | 7.2 km || 
|-id=710 bgcolor=#fefefe
| 35710 ||  || — || March 19, 1999 || Socorro || LINEAR || ERI || align=right | 4.2 km || 
|-id=711 bgcolor=#fefefe
| 35711 ||  || — || March 19, 1999 || Socorro || LINEAR || NYS || align=right | 4.3 km || 
|-id=712 bgcolor=#fefefe
| 35712 ||  || — || March 19, 1999 || Socorro || LINEAR || — || align=right | 2.6 km || 
|-id=713 bgcolor=#fefefe
| 35713 ||  || — || March 19, 1999 || Socorro || LINEAR || — || align=right | 2.1 km || 
|-id=714 bgcolor=#fefefe
| 35714 ||  || — || March 19, 1999 || Socorro || LINEAR || — || align=right | 2.5 km || 
|-id=715 bgcolor=#fefefe
| 35715 ||  || — || March 19, 1999 || Socorro || LINEAR || NYS || align=right | 2.5 km || 
|-id=716 bgcolor=#fefefe
| 35716 ||  || — || March 19, 1999 || Socorro || LINEAR || V || align=right | 2.6 km || 
|-id=717 bgcolor=#fefefe
| 35717 ||  || — || March 19, 1999 || Socorro || LINEAR || — || align=right | 4.1 km || 
|-id=718 bgcolor=#fefefe
| 35718 ||  || — || March 19, 1999 || Socorro || LINEAR || — || align=right | 2.2 km || 
|-id=719 bgcolor=#fefefe
| 35719 ||  || — || March 19, 1999 || Socorro || LINEAR || V || align=right | 2.2 km || 
|-id=720 bgcolor=#fefefe
| 35720 ||  || — || March 20, 1999 || Socorro || LINEAR || FLO || align=right | 2.8 km || 
|-id=721 bgcolor=#fefefe
| 35721 ||  || — || March 20, 1999 || Socorro || LINEAR || V || align=right | 2.1 km || 
|-id=722 bgcolor=#fefefe
| 35722 ||  || — || March 20, 1999 || Socorro || LINEAR || — || align=right | 1.8 km || 
|-id=723 bgcolor=#fefefe
| 35723 ||  || — || March 20, 1999 || Socorro || LINEAR || FLO || align=right | 3.3 km || 
|-id=724 bgcolor=#fefefe
| 35724 ||  || — || March 20, 1999 || Socorro || LINEAR || — || align=right | 4.2 km || 
|-id=725 bgcolor=#E9E9E9
| 35725 Tramuntana ||  ||  || March 27, 1999 || Majorca || Á. López J., R. Pacheco || — || align=right | 2.7 km || 
|-id=726 bgcolor=#fefefe
| 35726 || 1999 GW || — || April 5, 1999 || Višnjan Observatory || K. Korlević || — || align=right | 2.2 km || 
|-id=727 bgcolor=#fefefe
| 35727 ||  || — || April 7, 1999 || Oizumi || T. Kobayashi || FLO || align=right | 2.8 km || 
|-id=728 bgcolor=#fefefe
| 35728 ||  || — || April 6, 1999 || Anderson Mesa || LONEOS || FLO || align=right | 3.3 km || 
|-id=729 bgcolor=#fefefe
| 35729 ||  || — || April 13, 1999 || Woomera || F. B. Zoltowski || FLO || align=right | 3.0 km || 
|-id=730 bgcolor=#fefefe
| 35730 ||  || — || April 7, 1999 || Anderson Mesa || LONEOS || — || align=right | 2.1 km || 
|-id=731 bgcolor=#fefefe
| 35731 ||  || — || April 9, 1999 || Anderson Mesa || LONEOS || NYS || align=right | 1.4 km || 
|-id=732 bgcolor=#fefefe
| 35732 ||  || — || April 9, 1999 || Anderson Mesa || LONEOS || — || align=right | 2.7 km || 
|-id=733 bgcolor=#fefefe
| 35733 ||  || — || April 10, 1999 || Anderson Mesa || LONEOS || — || align=right | 2.0 km || 
|-id=734 bgcolor=#fefefe
| 35734 Dilithium ||  ||  || April 14, 1999 || Goodricke-Pigott || R. A. Tucker || — || align=right | 1.8 km || 
|-id=735 bgcolor=#E9E9E9
| 35735 ||  || — || April 11, 1999 || Kitt Peak || Spacewatch || — || align=right | 2.6 km || 
|-id=736 bgcolor=#fefefe
| 35736 ||  || — || April 15, 1999 || Socorro || LINEAR || FLO || align=right | 3.1 km || 
|-id=737 bgcolor=#fefefe
| 35737 ||  || — || April 15, 1999 || Socorro || LINEAR || — || align=right | 4.3 km || 
|-id=738 bgcolor=#fefefe
| 35738 ||  || — || April 15, 1999 || Socorro || LINEAR || FLO || align=right | 2.8 km || 
|-id=739 bgcolor=#fefefe
| 35739 ||  || — || April 15, 1999 || Socorro || LINEAR || — || align=right | 3.2 km || 
|-id=740 bgcolor=#fefefe
| 35740 ||  || — || April 6, 1999 || Socorro || LINEAR || NYS || align=right | 4.5 km || 
|-id=741 bgcolor=#fefefe
| 35741 ||  || — || April 6, 1999 || Socorro || LINEAR || — || align=right | 2.6 km || 
|-id=742 bgcolor=#fefefe
| 35742 ||  || — || April 7, 1999 || Socorro || LINEAR || — || align=right | 2.6 km || 
|-id=743 bgcolor=#fefefe
| 35743 ||  || — || April 7, 1999 || Socorro || LINEAR || — || align=right | 1.8 km || 
|-id=744 bgcolor=#fefefe
| 35744 ||  || — || April 7, 1999 || Socorro || LINEAR || — || align=right | 1.7 km || 
|-id=745 bgcolor=#fefefe
| 35745 ||  || — || April 7, 1999 || Socorro || LINEAR || NYS || align=right | 5.0 km || 
|-id=746 bgcolor=#fefefe
| 35746 ||  || — || April 7, 1999 || Socorro || LINEAR || FLO || align=right | 2.4 km || 
|-id=747 bgcolor=#E9E9E9
| 35747 ||  || — || April 7, 1999 || Socorro || LINEAR || — || align=right | 4.1 km || 
|-id=748 bgcolor=#fefefe
| 35748 ||  || — || April 7, 1999 || Socorro || LINEAR || V || align=right | 2.5 km || 
|-id=749 bgcolor=#fefefe
| 35749 ||  || — || April 12, 1999 || Socorro || LINEAR || — || align=right | 3.1 km || 
|-id=750 bgcolor=#fefefe
| 35750 ||  || — || April 6, 1999 || Socorro || LINEAR || — || align=right | 2.3 km || 
|-id=751 bgcolor=#fefefe
| 35751 ||  || — || April 7, 1999 || Socorro || LINEAR || FLO || align=right | 2.8 km || 
|-id=752 bgcolor=#fefefe
| 35752 ||  || — || April 14, 1999 || Socorro || LINEAR || NYS || align=right | 2.1 km || 
|-id=753 bgcolor=#fefefe
| 35753 ||  || — || April 12, 1999 || Socorro || LINEAR || — || align=right | 3.9 km || 
|-id=754 bgcolor=#fefefe
| 35754 ||  || — || April 10, 1999 || Anderson Mesa || LONEOS || — || align=right | 2.3 km || 
|-id=755 bgcolor=#fefefe
| 35755 ||  || — || April 11, 1999 || Anderson Mesa || LONEOS || — || align=right | 2.2 km || 
|-id=756 bgcolor=#E9E9E9
| 35756 ||  || — || April 12, 1999 || Socorro || LINEAR || — || align=right | 5.1 km || 
|-id=757 bgcolor=#fefefe
| 35757 ||  || — || April 15, 1999 || Socorro || LINEAR || — || align=right | 1.7 km || 
|-id=758 bgcolor=#fefefe
| 35758 || 1999 HE || — || April 16, 1999 || Woomera || F. B. Zoltowski || — || align=right | 2.1 km || 
|-id=759 bgcolor=#fefefe
| 35759 || 1999 HQ || — || April 17, 1999 || Woomera || F. B. Zoltowski || — || align=right | 6.5 km || 
|-id=760 bgcolor=#fefefe
| 35760 ||  || — || April 17, 1999 || Socorro || LINEAR || PHO || align=right | 2.1 km || 
|-id=761 bgcolor=#fefefe
| 35761 ||  || — || April 21, 1999 || Kleť || Kleť Obs. || — || align=right | 5.0 km || 
|-id=762 bgcolor=#fefefe
| 35762 ||  || — || April 20, 1999 || Višnjan Observatory || K. Korlević, M. Jurić || — || align=right | 2.0 km || 
|-id=763 bgcolor=#fefefe
| 35763 ||  || — || April 16, 1999 || Catalina || CSS || — || align=right | 1.9 km || 
|-id=764 bgcolor=#fefefe
| 35764 ||  || — || April 19, 1999 || Kitt Peak || Spacewatch || — || align=right | 2.3 km || 
|-id=765 bgcolor=#fefefe
| 35765 ||  || — || April 17, 1999 || Socorro || LINEAR || NYS || align=right | 6.2 km || 
|-id=766 bgcolor=#fefefe
| 35766 ||  || — || April 17, 1999 || Socorro || LINEAR || FLO || align=right | 1.8 km || 
|-id=767 bgcolor=#fefefe
| 35767 || 1999 JM || — || May 6, 1999 || Oizumi || T. Kobayashi || — || align=right | 4.6 km || 
|-id=768 bgcolor=#d6d6d6
| 35768 Wendybauer ||  ||  || May 8, 1999 || Catalina || CSS || KOR || align=right | 3.3 km || 
|-id=769 bgcolor=#fefefe
| 35769 Tombauer ||  ||  || May 8, 1999 || Catalina || CSS || V || align=right | 2.5 km || 
|-id=770 bgcolor=#fefefe
| 35770 ||  || — || May 8, 1999 || Catalina || CSS || — || align=right | 2.2 km || 
|-id=771 bgcolor=#fefefe
| 35771 ||  || — || May 11, 1999 || Nachi-Katsuura || Y. Shimizu, T. Urata || — || align=right | 4.0 km || 
|-id=772 bgcolor=#fefefe
| 35772 ||  || — || May 8, 1999 || Catalina || CSS || V || align=right | 2.8 km || 
|-id=773 bgcolor=#fefefe
| 35773 ||  || — || May 13, 1999 || Reedy Creek || J. Broughton || — || align=right | 2.0 km || 
|-id=774 bgcolor=#E9E9E9
| 35774 ||  || — || May 7, 1999 || Catalina || CSS || — || align=right | 5.2 km || 
|-id=775 bgcolor=#E9E9E9
| 35775 ||  || — || May 8, 1999 || Catalina || CSS || — || align=right | 3.2 km || 
|-id=776 bgcolor=#fefefe
| 35776 ||  || — || May 9, 1999 || Višnjan Observatory || K. Korlević || NYS || align=right | 1.7 km || 
|-id=777 bgcolor=#E9E9E9
| 35777 ||  || — || May 10, 1999 || Višnjan Observatory || K. Korlević || CLO || align=right | 4.8 km || 
|-id=778 bgcolor=#fefefe
| 35778 ||  || — || May 15, 1999 || Kitt Peak || Spacewatch || — || align=right | 2.4 km || 
|-id=779 bgcolor=#fefefe
| 35779 ||  || — || May 10, 1999 || Socorro || LINEAR || V || align=right | 1.7 km || 
|-id=780 bgcolor=#E9E9E9
| 35780 ||  || — || May 10, 1999 || Socorro || LINEAR || — || align=right | 3.1 km || 
|-id=781 bgcolor=#fefefe
| 35781 ||  || — || May 10, 1999 || Socorro || LINEAR || — || align=right | 2.4 km || 
|-id=782 bgcolor=#fefefe
| 35782 ||  || — || May 10, 1999 || Socorro || LINEAR || FLO || align=right | 2.8 km || 
|-id=783 bgcolor=#fefefe
| 35783 ||  || — || May 10, 1999 || Socorro || LINEAR || — || align=right | 3.5 km || 
|-id=784 bgcolor=#fefefe
| 35784 ||  || — || May 10, 1999 || Socorro || LINEAR || — || align=right | 2.3 km || 
|-id=785 bgcolor=#fefefe
| 35785 ||  || — || May 10, 1999 || Socorro || LINEAR || — || align=right | 2.4 km || 
|-id=786 bgcolor=#fefefe
| 35786 ||  || — || May 10, 1999 || Socorro || LINEAR || FLO || align=right | 3.0 km || 
|-id=787 bgcolor=#E9E9E9
| 35787 ||  || — || May 10, 1999 || Socorro || LINEAR || — || align=right | 2.7 km || 
|-id=788 bgcolor=#fefefe
| 35788 ||  || — || May 10, 1999 || Socorro || LINEAR || — || align=right | 3.6 km || 
|-id=789 bgcolor=#fefefe
| 35789 ||  || — || May 10, 1999 || Socorro || LINEAR || FLO || align=right | 1.7 km || 
|-id=790 bgcolor=#fefefe
| 35790 ||  || — || May 10, 1999 || Socorro || LINEAR || FLO || align=right | 2.8 km || 
|-id=791 bgcolor=#fefefe
| 35791 ||  || — || May 10, 1999 || Socorro || LINEAR || — || align=right | 2.3 km || 
|-id=792 bgcolor=#fefefe
| 35792 ||  || — || May 10, 1999 || Socorro || LINEAR || V || align=right | 1.8 km || 
|-id=793 bgcolor=#fefefe
| 35793 ||  || — || May 10, 1999 || Socorro || LINEAR || V || align=right | 2.6 km || 
|-id=794 bgcolor=#fefefe
| 35794 ||  || — || May 10, 1999 || Socorro || LINEAR || FLO || align=right | 2.3 km || 
|-id=795 bgcolor=#fefefe
| 35795 ||  || — || May 10, 1999 || Socorro || LINEAR || FLO || align=right | 1.6 km || 
|-id=796 bgcolor=#fefefe
| 35796 ||  || — || May 10, 1999 || Socorro || LINEAR || — || align=right | 2.1 km || 
|-id=797 bgcolor=#fefefe
| 35797 ||  || — || May 10, 1999 || Socorro || LINEAR || — || align=right | 3.1 km || 
|-id=798 bgcolor=#fefefe
| 35798 ||  || — || May 10, 1999 || Socorro || LINEAR || NYS || align=right | 2.0 km || 
|-id=799 bgcolor=#fefefe
| 35799 ||  || — || May 10, 1999 || Socorro || LINEAR || — || align=right | 2.1 km || 
|-id=800 bgcolor=#fefefe
| 35800 ||  || — || May 10, 1999 || Socorro || LINEAR || — || align=right | 2.7 km || 
|}

35801–35900 

|-bgcolor=#fefefe
| 35801 ||  || — || May 10, 1999 || Socorro || LINEAR || — || align=right | 3.7 km || 
|-id=802 bgcolor=#fefefe
| 35802 ||  || — || May 10, 1999 || Socorro || LINEAR || FLO || align=right | 1.7 km || 
|-id=803 bgcolor=#fefefe
| 35803 ||  || — || May 10, 1999 || Socorro || LINEAR || FLO || align=right | 1.8 km || 
|-id=804 bgcolor=#fefefe
| 35804 ||  || — || May 10, 1999 || Socorro || LINEAR || — || align=right | 3.0 km || 
|-id=805 bgcolor=#fefefe
| 35805 ||  || — || May 10, 1999 || Socorro || LINEAR || FLO || align=right | 3.0 km || 
|-id=806 bgcolor=#fefefe
| 35806 ||  || — || May 10, 1999 || Socorro || LINEAR || MAS || align=right | 1.7 km || 
|-id=807 bgcolor=#fefefe
| 35807 ||  || — || May 10, 1999 || Socorro || LINEAR || V || align=right | 1.8 km || 
|-id=808 bgcolor=#E9E9E9
| 35808 ||  || — || May 10, 1999 || Socorro || LINEAR || — || align=right | 6.1 km || 
|-id=809 bgcolor=#fefefe
| 35809 ||  || — || May 10, 1999 || Socorro || LINEAR || — || align=right | 3.5 km || 
|-id=810 bgcolor=#E9E9E9
| 35810 ||  || — || May 10, 1999 || Socorro || LINEAR || — || align=right | 3.8 km || 
|-id=811 bgcolor=#fefefe
| 35811 ||  || — || May 10, 1999 || Socorro || LINEAR || — || align=right | 3.3 km || 
|-id=812 bgcolor=#E9E9E9
| 35812 ||  || — || May 10, 1999 || Socorro || LINEAR || — || align=right | 2.5 km || 
|-id=813 bgcolor=#E9E9E9
| 35813 ||  || — || May 10, 1999 || Socorro || LINEAR || — || align=right | 6.5 km || 
|-id=814 bgcolor=#E9E9E9
| 35814 ||  || — || May 10, 1999 || Socorro || LINEAR || — || align=right | 2.7 km || 
|-id=815 bgcolor=#E9E9E9
| 35815 ||  || — || May 10, 1999 || Socorro || LINEAR || — || align=right | 5.8 km || 
|-id=816 bgcolor=#fefefe
| 35816 ||  || — || May 10, 1999 || Socorro || LINEAR || — || align=right | 2.2 km || 
|-id=817 bgcolor=#fefefe
| 35817 ||  || — || May 10, 1999 || Socorro || LINEAR || NYS || align=right | 2.6 km || 
|-id=818 bgcolor=#E9E9E9
| 35818 ||  || — || May 10, 1999 || Socorro || LINEAR || — || align=right | 4.7 km || 
|-id=819 bgcolor=#fefefe
| 35819 ||  || — || May 10, 1999 || Socorro || LINEAR || FLO || align=right | 2.1 km || 
|-id=820 bgcolor=#fefefe
| 35820 ||  || — || May 10, 1999 || Socorro || LINEAR || V || align=right | 1.8 km || 
|-id=821 bgcolor=#fefefe
| 35821 ||  || — || May 10, 1999 || Socorro || LINEAR || V || align=right | 2.9 km || 
|-id=822 bgcolor=#fefefe
| 35822 ||  || — || May 10, 1999 || Socorro || LINEAR || — || align=right | 2.8 km || 
|-id=823 bgcolor=#fefefe
| 35823 ||  || — || May 10, 1999 || Socorro || LINEAR || NYS || align=right | 1.8 km || 
|-id=824 bgcolor=#fefefe
| 35824 ||  || — || May 10, 1999 || Socorro || LINEAR || V || align=right | 2.4 km || 
|-id=825 bgcolor=#E9E9E9
| 35825 ||  || — || May 10, 1999 || Socorro || LINEAR || — || align=right | 3.5 km || 
|-id=826 bgcolor=#E9E9E9
| 35826 ||  || — || May 10, 1999 || Socorro || LINEAR || — || align=right | 2.8 km || 
|-id=827 bgcolor=#E9E9E9
| 35827 ||  || — || May 10, 1999 || Socorro || LINEAR || — || align=right | 4.6 km || 
|-id=828 bgcolor=#fefefe
| 35828 ||  || — || May 10, 1999 || Socorro || LINEAR || — || align=right | 2.2 km || 
|-id=829 bgcolor=#E9E9E9
| 35829 ||  || — || May 10, 1999 || Socorro || LINEAR || — || align=right | 3.5 km || 
|-id=830 bgcolor=#fefefe
| 35830 ||  || — || May 10, 1999 || Socorro || LINEAR || — || align=right | 5.1 km || 
|-id=831 bgcolor=#fefefe
| 35831 ||  || — || May 10, 1999 || Socorro || LINEAR || V || align=right | 2.8 km || 
|-id=832 bgcolor=#fefefe
| 35832 ||  || — || May 10, 1999 || Socorro || LINEAR || — || align=right | 3.4 km || 
|-id=833 bgcolor=#E9E9E9
| 35833 ||  || — || May 10, 1999 || Socorro || LINEAR || — || align=right | 3.1 km || 
|-id=834 bgcolor=#fefefe
| 35834 ||  || — || May 10, 1999 || Socorro || LINEAR || — || align=right | 6.9 km || 
|-id=835 bgcolor=#E9E9E9
| 35835 ||  || — || May 10, 1999 || Socorro || LINEAR || — || align=right | 3.5 km || 
|-id=836 bgcolor=#fefefe
| 35836 ||  || — || May 10, 1999 || Socorro || LINEAR || NYS || align=right | 5.3 km || 
|-id=837 bgcolor=#E9E9E9
| 35837 ||  || — || May 10, 1999 || Socorro || LINEAR || — || align=right | 9.9 km || 
|-id=838 bgcolor=#fefefe
| 35838 ||  || — || May 10, 1999 || Socorro || LINEAR || V || align=right | 2.8 km || 
|-id=839 bgcolor=#fefefe
| 35839 ||  || — || May 10, 1999 || Socorro || LINEAR || FLO || align=right | 3.6 km || 
|-id=840 bgcolor=#E9E9E9
| 35840 ||  || — || May 10, 1999 || Socorro || LINEAR || — || align=right | 5.8 km || 
|-id=841 bgcolor=#fefefe
| 35841 ||  || — || May 10, 1999 || Socorro || LINEAR || V || align=right | 2.0 km || 
|-id=842 bgcolor=#E9E9E9
| 35842 ||  || — || May 10, 1999 || Socorro || LINEAR || — || align=right | 4.1 km || 
|-id=843 bgcolor=#fefefe
| 35843 ||  || — || May 10, 1999 || Socorro || LINEAR || MAS || align=right | 2.6 km || 
|-id=844 bgcolor=#fefefe
| 35844 ||  || — || May 10, 1999 || Socorro || LINEAR || — || align=right | 7.1 km || 
|-id=845 bgcolor=#E9E9E9
| 35845 ||  || — || May 10, 1999 || Socorro || LINEAR || — || align=right | 3.9 km || 
|-id=846 bgcolor=#fefefe
| 35846 ||  || — || May 10, 1999 || Socorro || LINEAR || FLO || align=right | 3.0 km || 
|-id=847 bgcolor=#fefefe
| 35847 ||  || — || May 10, 1999 || Socorro || LINEAR || — || align=right | 5.9 km || 
|-id=848 bgcolor=#E9E9E9
| 35848 ||  || — || May 10, 1999 || Socorro || LINEAR || MIT || align=right | 5.3 km || 
|-id=849 bgcolor=#fefefe
| 35849 ||  || — || May 10, 1999 || Socorro || LINEAR || — || align=right | 2.2 km || 
|-id=850 bgcolor=#E9E9E9
| 35850 ||  || — || May 10, 1999 || Socorro || LINEAR || — || align=right | 3.1 km || 
|-id=851 bgcolor=#E9E9E9
| 35851 ||  || — || May 10, 1999 || Socorro || LINEAR || — || align=right | 2.7 km || 
|-id=852 bgcolor=#fefefe
| 35852 ||  || — || May 10, 1999 || Socorro || LINEAR || V || align=right | 2.3 km || 
|-id=853 bgcolor=#E9E9E9
| 35853 ||  || — || May 10, 1999 || Socorro || LINEAR || — || align=right | 4.4 km || 
|-id=854 bgcolor=#E9E9E9
| 35854 ||  || — || May 10, 1999 || Socorro || LINEAR || — || align=right | 7.1 km || 
|-id=855 bgcolor=#E9E9E9
| 35855 ||  || — || May 10, 1999 || Socorro || LINEAR || — || align=right | 7.5 km || 
|-id=856 bgcolor=#fefefe
| 35856 ||  || — || May 10, 1999 || Socorro || LINEAR || — || align=right | 6.3 km || 
|-id=857 bgcolor=#fefefe
| 35857 ||  || — || May 10, 1999 || Socorro || LINEAR || FLO || align=right | 3.5 km || 
|-id=858 bgcolor=#fefefe
| 35858 ||  || — || May 12, 1999 || Socorro || LINEAR || — || align=right | 4.5 km || 
|-id=859 bgcolor=#fefefe
| 35859 ||  || — || May 12, 1999 || Socorro || LINEAR || EUT || align=right | 3.5 km || 
|-id=860 bgcolor=#fefefe
| 35860 ||  || — || May 12, 1999 || Socorro || LINEAR || — || align=right | 3.9 km || 
|-id=861 bgcolor=#fefefe
| 35861 ||  || — || May 12, 1999 || Socorro || LINEAR || NYS || align=right | 1.7 km || 
|-id=862 bgcolor=#E9E9E9
| 35862 ||  || — || May 12, 1999 || Socorro || LINEAR || — || align=right | 5.2 km || 
|-id=863 bgcolor=#E9E9E9
| 35863 ||  || — || May 12, 1999 || Socorro || LINEAR || — || align=right | 3.4 km || 
|-id=864 bgcolor=#E9E9E9
| 35864 ||  || — || May 12, 1999 || Socorro || LINEAR || — || align=right | 6.9 km || 
|-id=865 bgcolor=#fefefe
| 35865 ||  || — || May 12, 1999 || Socorro || LINEAR || NYS || align=right | 2.2 km || 
|-id=866 bgcolor=#fefefe
| 35866 ||  || — || May 12, 1999 || Socorro || LINEAR || V || align=right | 2.1 km || 
|-id=867 bgcolor=#fefefe
| 35867 ||  || — || May 12, 1999 || Socorro || LINEAR || FLO || align=right | 3.5 km || 
|-id=868 bgcolor=#fefefe
| 35868 ||  || — || May 12, 1999 || Socorro || LINEAR || NYS || align=right | 1.7 km || 
|-id=869 bgcolor=#fefefe
| 35869 ||  || — || May 12, 1999 || Socorro || LINEAR || NYS || align=right | 4.9 km || 
|-id=870 bgcolor=#fefefe
| 35870 ||  || — || May 12, 1999 || Socorro || LINEAR || — || align=right | 1.8 km || 
|-id=871 bgcolor=#fefefe
| 35871 ||  || — || May 12, 1999 || Socorro || LINEAR || V || align=right | 1.9 km || 
|-id=872 bgcolor=#fefefe
| 35872 ||  || — || May 12, 1999 || Socorro || LINEAR || FLO || align=right | 1.5 km || 
|-id=873 bgcolor=#fefefe
| 35873 ||  || — || May 12, 1999 || Socorro || LINEAR || — || align=right | 1.7 km || 
|-id=874 bgcolor=#fefefe
| 35874 ||  || — || May 12, 1999 || Socorro || LINEAR || — || align=right | 2.2 km || 
|-id=875 bgcolor=#fefefe
| 35875 ||  || — || May 12, 1999 || Socorro || LINEAR || V || align=right | 4.6 km || 
|-id=876 bgcolor=#E9E9E9
| 35876 ||  || — || May 12, 1999 || Socorro || LINEAR || — || align=right | 3.9 km || 
|-id=877 bgcolor=#fefefe
| 35877 ||  || — || May 10, 1999 || Socorro || LINEAR || — || align=right | 4.4 km || 
|-id=878 bgcolor=#fefefe
| 35878 ||  || — || May 10, 1999 || Socorro || LINEAR || — || align=right | 2.8 km || 
|-id=879 bgcolor=#fefefe
| 35879 ||  || — || May 10, 1999 || Socorro || LINEAR || — || align=right | 2.5 km || 
|-id=880 bgcolor=#fefefe
| 35880 ||  || — || May 10, 1999 || Socorro || LINEAR || V || align=right | 4.2 km || 
|-id=881 bgcolor=#E9E9E9
| 35881 ||  || — || May 12, 1999 || Socorro || LINEAR || — || align=right | 3.7 km || 
|-id=882 bgcolor=#fefefe
| 35882 ||  || — || May 12, 1999 || Socorro || LINEAR || — || align=right | 2.0 km || 
|-id=883 bgcolor=#fefefe
| 35883 ||  || — || May 13, 1999 || Socorro || LINEAR || — || align=right | 3.6 km || 
|-id=884 bgcolor=#fefefe
| 35884 ||  || — || May 13, 1999 || Socorro || LINEAR || FLO || align=right | 2.2 km || 
|-id=885 bgcolor=#fefefe
| 35885 ||  || — || May 13, 1999 || Socorro || LINEAR || MAS || align=right | 1.9 km || 
|-id=886 bgcolor=#fefefe
| 35886 ||  || — || May 12, 1999 || Socorro || LINEAR || V || align=right | 4.0 km || 
|-id=887 bgcolor=#E9E9E9
| 35887 ||  || — || May 12, 1999 || Socorro || LINEAR || RAF || align=right | 2.7 km || 
|-id=888 bgcolor=#E9E9E9
| 35888 ||  || — || May 12, 1999 || Socorro || LINEAR || — || align=right | 4.2 km || 
|-id=889 bgcolor=#E9E9E9
| 35889 ||  || — || May 12, 1999 || Socorro || LINEAR || EUN || align=right | 3.7 km || 
|-id=890 bgcolor=#fefefe
| 35890 ||  || — || May 12, 1999 || Socorro || LINEAR || — || align=right | 4.0 km || 
|-id=891 bgcolor=#fefefe
| 35891 ||  || — || May 12, 1999 || Socorro || LINEAR || — || align=right | 5.1 km || 
|-id=892 bgcolor=#E9E9E9
| 35892 ||  || — || May 12, 1999 || Socorro || LINEAR || EUN || align=right | 6.3 km || 
|-id=893 bgcolor=#fefefe
| 35893 ||  || — || May 12, 1999 || Socorro || LINEAR || — || align=right | 2.3 km || 
|-id=894 bgcolor=#E9E9E9
| 35894 ||  || — || May 12, 1999 || Socorro || LINEAR || EUN || align=right | 5.1 km || 
|-id=895 bgcolor=#fefefe
| 35895 ||  || — || May 12, 1999 || Socorro || LINEAR || — || align=right | 2.3 km || 
|-id=896 bgcolor=#E9E9E9
| 35896 ||  || — || May 13, 1999 || Socorro || LINEAR || — || align=right | 5.3 km || 
|-id=897 bgcolor=#fefefe
| 35897 ||  || — || May 10, 1999 || Socorro || LINEAR || V || align=right | 2.2 km || 
|-id=898 bgcolor=#fefefe
| 35898 ||  || — || May 12, 1999 || Socorro || LINEAR || — || align=right | 2.0 km || 
|-id=899 bgcolor=#d6d6d6
| 35899 ||  || — || May 12, 1999 || Socorro || LINEAR || — || align=right | 7.0 km || 
|-id=900 bgcolor=#fefefe
| 35900 ||  || — || May 12, 1999 || Socorro || LINEAR || — || align=right | 2.1 km || 
|}

35901–36000 

|-bgcolor=#fefefe
| 35901 ||  || — || May 12, 1999 || Socorro || LINEAR || — || align=right | 3.3 km || 
|-id=902 bgcolor=#fefefe
| 35902 ||  || — || May 12, 1999 || Socorro || LINEAR || V || align=right | 1.7 km || 
|-id=903 bgcolor=#E9E9E9
| 35903 ||  || — || May 12, 1999 || Socorro || LINEAR || — || align=right | 5.0 km || 
|-id=904 bgcolor=#fefefe
| 35904 ||  || — || May 12, 1999 || Socorro || LINEAR || FLO || align=right | 2.1 km || 
|-id=905 bgcolor=#fefefe
| 35905 ||  || — || May 12, 1999 || Socorro || LINEAR || — || align=right | 1.9 km || 
|-id=906 bgcolor=#E9E9E9
| 35906 ||  || — || May 12, 1999 || Socorro || LINEAR || EUN || align=right | 2.7 km || 
|-id=907 bgcolor=#fefefe
| 35907 ||  || — || May 12, 1999 || Socorro || LINEAR || — || align=right | 2.0 km || 
|-id=908 bgcolor=#fefefe
| 35908 ||  || — || May 12, 1999 || Socorro || LINEAR || — || align=right | 2.4 km || 
|-id=909 bgcolor=#fefefe
| 35909 ||  || — || May 12, 1999 || Socorro || LINEAR || V || align=right | 2.6 km || 
|-id=910 bgcolor=#fefefe
| 35910 ||  || — || May 12, 1999 || Socorro || LINEAR || — || align=right | 1.9 km || 
|-id=911 bgcolor=#E9E9E9
| 35911 ||  || — || May 12, 1999 || Socorro || LINEAR || — || align=right | 4.2 km || 
|-id=912 bgcolor=#E9E9E9
| 35912 ||  || — || May 12, 1999 || Socorro || LINEAR || — || align=right | 2.9 km || 
|-id=913 bgcolor=#d6d6d6
| 35913 ||  || — || May 12, 1999 || Socorro || LINEAR || MEL || align=right | 7.9 km || 
|-id=914 bgcolor=#fefefe
| 35914 ||  || — || May 12, 1999 || Socorro || LINEAR || V || align=right | 1.9 km || 
|-id=915 bgcolor=#E9E9E9
| 35915 ||  || — || May 12, 1999 || Socorro || LINEAR || — || align=right | 7.9 km || 
|-id=916 bgcolor=#E9E9E9
| 35916 ||  || — || May 12, 1999 || Socorro || LINEAR || — || align=right | 4.5 km || 
|-id=917 bgcolor=#E9E9E9
| 35917 ||  || — || May 13, 1999 || Socorro || LINEAR || GEF || align=right | 3.4 km || 
|-id=918 bgcolor=#E9E9E9
| 35918 ||  || — || May 12, 1999 || Socorro || LINEAR || — || align=right | 4.5 km || 
|-id=919 bgcolor=#d6d6d6
| 35919 ||  || — || May 12, 1999 || Socorro || LINEAR || — || align=right | 11 km || 
|-id=920 bgcolor=#fefefe
| 35920 ||  || — || May 13, 1999 || Socorro || LINEAR || — || align=right | 2.5 km || 
|-id=921 bgcolor=#fefefe
| 35921 ||  || — || May 13, 1999 || Socorro || LINEAR || — || align=right | 1.8 km || 
|-id=922 bgcolor=#E9E9E9
| 35922 ||  || — || May 13, 1999 || Socorro || LINEAR || — || align=right | 2.5 km || 
|-id=923 bgcolor=#E9E9E9
| 35923 ||  || — || May 13, 1999 || Socorro || LINEAR || EUN || align=right | 2.7 km || 
|-id=924 bgcolor=#fefefe
| 35924 ||  || — || May 14, 1999 || Socorro || LINEAR || — || align=right | 7.7 km || 
|-id=925 bgcolor=#fefefe
| 35925 ||  || — || May 15, 1999 || Socorro || LINEAR || — || align=right | 4.4 km || 
|-id=926 bgcolor=#E9E9E9
| 35926 ||  || — || May 13, 1999 || Socorro || LINEAR || — || align=right | 8.3 km || 
|-id=927 bgcolor=#fefefe
| 35927 ||  || — || May 13, 1999 || Socorro || LINEAR || NYS || align=right | 4.8 km || 
|-id=928 bgcolor=#E9E9E9
| 35928 ||  || — || May 13, 1999 || Socorro || LINEAR || — || align=right | 3.8 km || 
|-id=929 bgcolor=#E9E9E9
| 35929 ||  || — || May 13, 1999 || Socorro || LINEAR || — || align=right | 6.1 km || 
|-id=930 bgcolor=#fefefe
| 35930 ||  || — || May 13, 1999 || Socorro || LINEAR || — || align=right | 1.8 km || 
|-id=931 bgcolor=#fefefe
| 35931 ||  || — || May 13, 1999 || Socorro || LINEAR || NYS || align=right | 1.8 km || 
|-id=932 bgcolor=#fefefe
| 35932 ||  || — || May 13, 1999 || Socorro || LINEAR || — || align=right | 1.8 km || 
|-id=933 bgcolor=#E9E9E9
| 35933 ||  || — || May 13, 1999 || Socorro || LINEAR || — || align=right | 3.5 km || 
|-id=934 bgcolor=#fefefe
| 35934 ||  || — || May 13, 1999 || Socorro || LINEAR || V || align=right | 2.0 km || 
|-id=935 bgcolor=#fefefe
| 35935 ||  || — || May 13, 1999 || Socorro || LINEAR || — || align=right | 2.2 km || 
|-id=936 bgcolor=#fefefe
| 35936 ||  || — || May 14, 1999 || Socorro || LINEAR || — || align=right | 3.4 km || 
|-id=937 bgcolor=#fefefe
| 35937 ||  || — || May 14, 1999 || Socorro || LINEAR || FLO || align=right | 2.3 km || 
|-id=938 bgcolor=#fefefe
| 35938 ||  || — || May 10, 1999 || Socorro || LINEAR || FLO || align=right | 2.1 km || 
|-id=939 bgcolor=#E9E9E9
| 35939 ||  || — || May 13, 1999 || Socorro || LINEAR || EUN || align=right | 4.4 km || 
|-id=940 bgcolor=#fefefe
| 35940 ||  || — || May 10, 1999 || Socorro || LINEAR || — || align=right | 1.8 km || 
|-id=941 bgcolor=#E9E9E9
| 35941 ||  || — || May 12, 1999 || Socorro || LINEAR || — || align=right | 3.7 km || 
|-id=942 bgcolor=#fefefe
| 35942 ||  || — || May 13, 1999 || Socorro || LINEAR || FLO || align=right | 1.4 km || 
|-id=943 bgcolor=#E9E9E9
| 35943 ||  || — || May 16, 1999 || Kitt Peak || Spacewatch || — || align=right | 5.6 km || 
|-id=944 bgcolor=#fefefe
| 35944 ||  || — || May 16, 1999 || Kitt Peak || Spacewatch || MAS || align=right | 1.8 km || 
|-id=945 bgcolor=#E9E9E9
| 35945 ||  || — || May 16, 1999 || Kitt Peak || Spacewatch || — || align=right | 3.0 km || 
|-id=946 bgcolor=#fefefe
| 35946 ||  || — || May 20, 1999 || Prescott || P. G. Comba || NYS || align=right | 3.7 km || 
|-id=947 bgcolor=#E9E9E9
| 35947 ||  || — || May 16, 1999 || Kitt Peak || Spacewatch || MAR || align=right | 4.3 km || 
|-id=948 bgcolor=#E9E9E9
| 35948 ||  || — || May 17, 1999 || Kitt Peak || Spacewatch || NEM || align=right | 4.9 km || 
|-id=949 bgcolor=#fefefe
| 35949 ||  || — || May 18, 1999 || Socorro || LINEAR || NYS || align=right | 3.5 km || 
|-id=950 bgcolor=#E9E9E9
| 35950 ||  || — || May 18, 1999 || Socorro || LINEAR || — || align=right | 3.8 km || 
|-id=951 bgcolor=#fefefe
| 35951 ||  || — || May 18, 1999 || Socorro || LINEAR || — || align=right | 4.0 km || 
|-id=952 bgcolor=#E9E9E9
| 35952 ||  || — || May 18, 1999 || Socorro || LINEAR || — || align=right | 3.1 km || 
|-id=953 bgcolor=#d6d6d6
| 35953 ||  || — || May 20, 1999 || Socorro || LINEAR || — || align=right | 8.7 km || 
|-id=954 bgcolor=#fefefe
| 35954 ||  || — || May 18, 1999 || Socorro || LINEAR || FLO || align=right | 3.1 km || 
|-id=955 bgcolor=#d6d6d6
| 35955 ||  || — || May 17, 1999 || Catalina || CSS || KOR || align=right | 4.3 km || 
|-id=956 bgcolor=#fefefe
| 35956 ||  || — || June 8, 1999 || Socorro || LINEAR || — || align=right | 2.2 km || 
|-id=957 bgcolor=#fefefe
| 35957 ||  || — || June 9, 1999 || Socorro || LINEAR || — || align=right | 2.1 km || 
|-id=958 bgcolor=#fefefe
| 35958 ||  || — || June 9, 1999 || Socorro || LINEAR || V || align=right | 3.1 km || 
|-id=959 bgcolor=#E9E9E9
| 35959 ||  || — || June 10, 1999 || Socorro || LINEAR || — || align=right | 3.9 km || 
|-id=960 bgcolor=#E9E9E9
| 35960 ||  || — || June 9, 1999 || Kitt Peak || Spacewatch || EUN || align=right | 3.2 km || 
|-id=961 bgcolor=#E9E9E9
| 35961 ||  || — || June 12, 1999 || Višnjan Observatory || K. Korlević || — || align=right | 7.5 km || 
|-id=962 bgcolor=#E9E9E9
| 35962 ||  || — || June 8, 1999 || Socorro || LINEAR || — || align=right | 6.4 km || 
|-id=963 bgcolor=#E9E9E9
| 35963 ||  || — || June 8, 1999 || Socorro || LINEAR || MAR || align=right | 4.1 km || 
|-id=964 bgcolor=#fefefe
| 35964 ||  || — || June 9, 1999 || Socorro || LINEAR || V || align=right | 1.8 km || 
|-id=965 bgcolor=#fefefe
| 35965 ||  || — || June 9, 1999 || Socorro || LINEAR || V || align=right | 3.2 km || 
|-id=966 bgcolor=#fefefe
| 35966 ||  || — || June 9, 1999 || Socorro || LINEAR || — || align=right | 2.3 km || 
|-id=967 bgcolor=#fefefe
| 35967 ||  || — || June 9, 1999 || Socorro || LINEAR || — || align=right | 3.5 km || 
|-id=968 bgcolor=#E9E9E9
| 35968 ||  || — || June 9, 1999 || Socorro || LINEAR || — || align=right | 3.3 km || 
|-id=969 bgcolor=#fefefe
| 35969 ||  || — || June 11, 1999 || Socorro || LINEAR || V || align=right | 1.8 km || 
|-id=970 bgcolor=#fefefe
| 35970 ||  || — || June 9, 1999 || Socorro || LINEAR || — || align=right | 2.5 km || 
|-id=971 bgcolor=#fefefe
| 35971 ||  || — || June 9, 1999 || Socorro || LINEAR || V || align=right | 2.8 km || 
|-id=972 bgcolor=#fefefe
| 35972 ||  || — || June 9, 1999 || Socorro || LINEAR || — || align=right | 3.1 km || 
|-id=973 bgcolor=#E9E9E9
| 35973 ||  || — || June 9, 1999 || Socorro || LINEAR || — || align=right | 5.4 km || 
|-id=974 bgcolor=#fefefe
| 35974 ||  || — || June 9, 1999 || Socorro || LINEAR || V || align=right | 2.7 km || 
|-id=975 bgcolor=#E9E9E9
| 35975 ||  || — || June 9, 1999 || Socorro || LINEAR || — || align=right | 5.4 km || 
|-id=976 bgcolor=#fefefe
| 35976 Yorktown ||  ||  || June 25, 1999 || Anderson Mesa || LONEOS || PHO || align=right | 3.7 km || 
|-id=977 bgcolor=#E9E9E9
| 35977 Lexington || 1999 NA ||  || July 3, 1999 || Kleť || J. Tichá, M. Tichý || — || align=right | 5.8 km || 
|-id=978 bgcolor=#fefefe
| 35978 Arlington || 1999 NC ||  || July 5, 1999 || Kleť || J. Tichá, M. Tichý || FLO || align=right | 3.4 km || 
|-id=979 bgcolor=#E9E9E9
| 35979 ||  || — || July 12, 1999 || Socorro || LINEAR || — || align=right | 7.3 km || 
|-id=980 bgcolor=#E9E9E9
| 35980 ||  || — || July 13, 1999 || Socorro || LINEAR || — || align=right | 3.8 km || 
|-id=981 bgcolor=#E9E9E9
| 35981 ||  || — || July 13, 1999 || Socorro || LINEAR || EUN || align=right | 4.0 km || 
|-id=982 bgcolor=#fefefe
| 35982 ||  || — || July 11, 1999 || Reedy Creek || J. Broughton || — || align=right | 1.7 km || 
|-id=983 bgcolor=#E9E9E9
| 35983 ||  || — || July 15, 1999 || Višnjan Observatory || K. Korlević || — || align=right | 4.9 km || 
|-id=984 bgcolor=#d6d6d6
| 35984 ||  || — || July 13, 1999 || Socorro || LINEAR || — || align=right | 7.4 km || 
|-id=985 bgcolor=#E9E9E9
| 35985 ||  || — || July 13, 1999 || Socorro || LINEAR || GEF || align=right | 4.3 km || 
|-id=986 bgcolor=#d6d6d6
| 35986 ||  || — || July 13, 1999 || Socorro || LINEAR || — || align=right | 6.9 km || 
|-id=987 bgcolor=#E9E9E9
| 35987 ||  || — || July 13, 1999 || Socorro || LINEAR || — || align=right | 2.7 km || 
|-id=988 bgcolor=#d6d6d6
| 35988 ||  || — || July 13, 1999 || Socorro || LINEAR || — || align=right | 11 km || 
|-id=989 bgcolor=#d6d6d6
| 35989 ||  || — || July 13, 1999 || Socorro || LINEAR || 2:1J || align=right | 7.2 km || 
|-id=990 bgcolor=#E9E9E9
| 35990 ||  || — || July 13, 1999 || Socorro || LINEAR || — || align=right | 3.8 km || 
|-id=991 bgcolor=#fefefe
| 35991 ||  || — || July 13, 1999 || Socorro || LINEAR || — || align=right | 2.6 km || 
|-id=992 bgcolor=#d6d6d6
| 35992 ||  || — || July 13, 1999 || Socorro || LINEAR || — || align=right | 3.3 km || 
|-id=993 bgcolor=#fefefe
| 35993 ||  || — || July 14, 1999 || Socorro || LINEAR || NYS || align=right | 2.8 km || 
|-id=994 bgcolor=#fefefe
| 35994 ||  || — || July 14, 1999 || Socorro || LINEAR || FLO || align=right | 6.3 km || 
|-id=995 bgcolor=#fefefe
| 35995 ||  || — || July 14, 1999 || Socorro || LINEAR || NYS || align=right | 1.7 km || 
|-id=996 bgcolor=#E9E9E9
| 35996 ||  || — || July 14, 1999 || Socorro || LINEAR || — || align=right | 3.6 km || 
|-id=997 bgcolor=#d6d6d6
| 35997 ||  || — || July 14, 1999 || Socorro || LINEAR || LIX || align=right | 8.4 km || 
|-id=998 bgcolor=#fefefe
| 35998 ||  || — || July 14, 1999 || Socorro || LINEAR || V || align=right | 3.0 km || 
|-id=999 bgcolor=#E9E9E9
| 35999 ||  || — || July 14, 1999 || Socorro || LINEAR || GEF || align=right | 3.5 km || 
|-id=000 bgcolor=#fefefe
| 36000 ||  || — || July 14, 1999 || Socorro || LINEAR || FLO || align=right | 2.4 km || 
|}

References

External links 
 Discovery Circumstances: Numbered Minor Planets (35001)–(40000) (IAU Minor Planet Center)

0035